

20001–20100 

|-bgcolor=#d6d6d6
| 20001 || 1991 CM || — || February 5, 1991 || Yorii || M. Arai, H. Mori || — || align=right | 23 km || 
|-id=002 bgcolor=#d6d6d6
| 20002 Tillysmith || 1991 EM ||  || March 10, 1991 || Siding Spring || R. H. McNaught || — || align=right | 12 km || 
|-id=003 bgcolor=#fefefe
| 20003 ||  || — || March 11, 1991 || La Silla || H. Debehogne || — || align=right | 3.4 km || 
|-id=004 bgcolor=#fefefe
| 20004 Audrey-Lucienne ||  ||  || April 8, 1991 || La Silla || E. W. Elst || — || align=right | 4.0 km || 
|-id=005 bgcolor=#fefefe
| 20005 ||  || — || April 8, 1991 || La Silla || E. W. Elst || — || align=right | 2.3 km || 
|-id=006 bgcolor=#d6d6d6
| 20006 Albertus Magnus ||  ||  || April 11, 1991 || Tautenburg Observatory || F. Börngen || — || align=right | 9.1 km || 
|-id=007 bgcolor=#fefefe
| 20007 Marybrown || 1991 LR ||  || June 7, 1991 || Palomar || C. S. Shoemaker, E. M. Shoemaker || — || align=right | 7.1 km || 
|-id=008 bgcolor=#E9E9E9
| 20008 ||  || — || July 4, 1991 || La Silla || H. Debehogne || EUN || align=right | 5.6 km || 
|-id=009 bgcolor=#E9E9E9
| 20009 || 1991 OY || — || July 18, 1991 || Palomar || H. E. Holt || RAF || align=right | 3.7 km || 
|-id=010 bgcolor=#fefefe
| 20010 ||  || — || August 2, 1991 || La Silla || E. W. Elst || NYS || align=right | 2.3 km || 
|-id=011 bgcolor=#E9E9E9
| 20011 ||  || — || August 5, 1991 || Palomar || H. E. Holt || — || align=right | 2.6 km || 
|-id=012 bgcolor=#E9E9E9
| 20012 Ranke ||  ||  || September 13, 1991 || Tautenburg Observatory || F. Börngen, L. D. Schmadel || — || align=right | 3.0 km || 
|-id=013 bgcolor=#E9E9E9
| 20013 ||  || — || September 11, 1991 || Palomar || H. E. Holt || EUN || align=right | 5.0 km || 
|-id=014 bgcolor=#E9E9E9
| 20014 ||  || — || September 13, 1991 || Palomar || H. E. Holt || — || align=right | 4.4 km || 
|-id=015 bgcolor=#E9E9E9
| 20015 || 1991 SR || — || September 30, 1991 || Siding Spring || R. H. McNaught || MAR || align=right | 4.4 km || 
|-id=016 bgcolor=#E9E9E9
| 20016 Rietschel ||  ||  || October 8, 1991 || Tautenburg Observatory || F. Börngen || — || align=right | 3.4 km || 
|-id=017 bgcolor=#E9E9E9
| 20017 Alixcatherine ||  ||  || October 2, 1991 || Palomar || C. P. de Saint-Aignan || — || align=right | 3.3 km || 
|-id=018 bgcolor=#fefefe
| 20018 ||  || — || October 29, 1991 || Kushiro || S. Ueda, H. Kaneda || FLO || align=right | 4.5 km || 
|-id=019 bgcolor=#E9E9E9
| 20019 Yukiotanaka || 1991 VN ||  || November 2, 1991 || Kitami || A. Takahashi, K. Watanabe || — || align=right | 3.3 km || 
|-id=020 bgcolor=#E9E9E9
| 20020 || 1991 VT || — || November 4, 1991 || Kani || Y. Mizuno, T. Furuta || — || align=right | 6.4 km || 
|-id=021 bgcolor=#E9E9E9
| 20021 ||  || — || November 6, 1991 || La Silla || E. W. Elst || MAR || align=right | 5.6 km || 
|-id=022 bgcolor=#E9E9E9
| 20022 ||  || — || November 3, 1991 || Kitt Peak || Spacewatch || — || align=right | 2.3 km || 
|-id=023 bgcolor=#E9E9E9
| 20023 || 1992 AR || — || January 9, 1992 || Palomar || E. F. Helin || — || align=right | 7.2 km || 
|-id=024 bgcolor=#E9E9E9
| 20024 Mayrémartínez ||  ||  || January 30, 1992 || La Silla || E. W. Elst || EUN || align=right | 7.7 km || 
|-id=025 bgcolor=#d6d6d6
| 20025 ||  || — || February 29, 1992 || La Silla || UESAC || KOR || align=right | 5.7 km || 
|-id=026 bgcolor=#d6d6d6
| 20026 ||  || — || March 6, 1992 || La Silla || UESAC || KOR || align=right | 5.0 km || 
|-id=027 bgcolor=#d6d6d6
| 20027 ||  || — || March 1, 1992 || La Silla || UESAC || — || align=right | 7.7 km || 
|-id=028 bgcolor=#d6d6d6
| 20028 ||  || — || March 1, 1992 || La Silla || UESAC || — || align=right | 7.4 km || 
|-id=029 bgcolor=#d6d6d6
| 20029 ||  || — || March 2, 1992 || La Silla || UESAC || KOR || align=right | 3.5 km || 
|-id=030 bgcolor=#fefefe
| 20030 ||  || — || March 1, 1992 || La Silla || UESAC || V || align=right | 2.4 km || 
|-id=031 bgcolor=#fefefe
| 20031 || 1992 OO || — || July 27, 1992 || Palomar || E. F. Helin || PHO || align=right | 4.6 km || 
|-id=032 bgcolor=#fefefe
| 20032 || 1992 PU || — || August 8, 1992 || Caussols || E. W. Elst || — || align=right | 2.8 km || 
|-id=033 bgcolor=#fefefe
| 20033 ||  || — || August 8, 1992 || Caussols || E. W. Elst || — || align=right | 3.7 km || 
|-id=034 bgcolor=#d6d6d6
| 20034 ||  || — || August 2, 1992 || Palomar || H. E. Holt || — || align=right | 12 km || 
|-id=035 bgcolor=#fefefe
| 20035 ||  || — || September 24, 1992 || Kitt Peak || Spacewatch || V || align=right | 2.7 km || 
|-id=036 bgcolor=#fefefe
| 20036 ||  || — || October 21, 1992 || Kani || Y. Mizuno, T. Furuta || NYS || align=right | 10 km || 
|-id=037 bgcolor=#FA8072
| 20037 Duke ||  ||  || October 20, 1992 || Palomar || C. S. Shoemaker, E. M. Shoemaker || H || align=right | 1.8 km || 
|-id=038 bgcolor=#d6d6d6
| 20038 Arasaki ||  ||  || October 26, 1992 || Kitami || K. Endate, K. Watanabe || 3:2 || align=right | 24 km || 
|-id=039 bgcolor=#fefefe
| 20039 || 1992 WJ || — || November 16, 1992 || Kushiro || S. Ueda, H. Kaneda || NYS || align=right | 2.9 km || 
|-id=040 bgcolor=#fefefe
| 20040 Tatsuyamatsuyama ||  ||  || November 21, 1992 || Geisei || T. Seki || — || align=right | 2.6 km || 
|-id=041 bgcolor=#E9E9E9
| 20041 || 1992 YH || — || December 18, 1992 || Yakiimo || A. Natori, T. Urata || — || align=right | 5.2 km || 
|-id=042 bgcolor=#E9E9E9
| 20042 ||  || — || February 15, 1993 || Yatsugatake || Y. Kushida, O. Muramatsu || — || align=right | 9.4 km || 
|-id=043 bgcolor=#fefefe
| 20043 Ellenmacarthur || 1993 EM ||  || March 2, 1993 || Siding Spring || R. H. McNaught || H || align=right | 1.6 km || 
|-id=044 bgcolor=#E9E9E9
| 20044 Vitoux ||  ||  || March 23, 1993 || Caussols || E. W. Elst || — || align=right | 4.9 km || 
|-id=045 bgcolor=#E9E9E9
| 20045 ||  || — || March 17, 1993 || La Silla || UESAC || — || align=right | 4.1 km || 
|-id=046 bgcolor=#E9E9E9
| 20046 ||  || — || March 17, 1993 || La Silla || UESAC || — || align=right | 5.4 km || 
|-id=047 bgcolor=#E9E9E9
| 20047 ||  || — || March 17, 1993 || La Silla || UESAC || — || align=right | 4.7 km || 
|-id=048 bgcolor=#E9E9E9
| 20048 ||  || — || March 17, 1993 || La Silla || UESAC || — || align=right | 6.4 km || 
|-id=049 bgcolor=#E9E9E9
| 20049 ||  || — || March 21, 1993 || La Silla || UESAC || MIS || align=right | 4.0 km || 
|-id=050 bgcolor=#E9E9E9
| 20050 ||  || — || March 21, 1993 || La Silla || UESAC || PADslow || align=right | 6.1 km || 
|-id=051 bgcolor=#E9E9E9
| 20051 ||  || — || March 21, 1993 || La Silla || UESAC || — || align=right | 5.9 km || 
|-id=052 bgcolor=#E9E9E9
| 20052 ||  || — || March 21, 1993 || La Silla || UESAC || — || align=right | 4.7 km || 
|-id=053 bgcolor=#E9E9E9
| 20053 ||  || — || March 21, 1993 || La Silla || UESAC || MAR || align=right | 3.4 km || 
|-id=054 bgcolor=#E9E9E9
| 20054 ||  || — || March 19, 1993 || La Silla || UESAC || HEN || align=right | 4.3 km || 
|-id=055 bgcolor=#E9E9E9
| 20055 ||  || — || March 19, 1993 || La Silla || UESAC || HEN || align=right | 2.6 km || 
|-id=056 bgcolor=#E9E9E9
| 20056 ||  || — || March 21, 1993 || La Silla || UESAC || — || align=right | 7.0 km || 
|-id=057 bgcolor=#E9E9E9
| 20057 || 1993 GC || — || April 13, 1993 || Kiyosato || S. Otomo || EUN || align=right | 7.4 km || 
|-id=058 bgcolor=#d6d6d6
| 20058 ||  || — || July 20, 1993 || La Silla || E. W. Elst || MRC || align=right | 12 km || 
|-id=059 bgcolor=#d6d6d6
| 20059 ||  || — || July 20, 1993 || La Silla || E. W. Elst || EOS || align=right | 7.6 km || 
|-id=060 bgcolor=#d6d6d6
| 20060 Johannforster ||  ||  || August 15, 1993 || Caussols || E. W. Elst || EOS || align=right | 9.0 km || 
|-id=061 bgcolor=#fefefe
| 20061 ||  || — || August 16, 1993 || Caussols || E. W. Elst || — || align=right | 2.7 km || 
|-id=062 bgcolor=#FA8072
| 20062 ||  || — || August 20, 1993 || Palomar || E. F. Helin || — || align=right | 3.8 km || 
|-id=063 bgcolor=#d6d6d6
| 20063 ||  || — || September 15, 1993 || La Silla || E. W. Elst || HYG || align=right | 11 km || 
|-id=064 bgcolor=#fefefe
| 20064 ||  || — || September 15, 1993 || La Silla || E. W. Elst || — || align=right | 2.2 km || 
|-id=065 bgcolor=#fefefe
| 20065 ||  || — || September 15, 1993 || La Silla || E. W. Elst || — || align=right | 2.0 km || 
|-id=066 bgcolor=#d6d6d6
| 20066 ||  || — || October 8, 1993 || Kitt Peak || Spacewatch || — || align=right | 8.2 km || 
|-id=067 bgcolor=#d6d6d6
| 20067 ||  || — || October 9, 1993 || La Silla || E. W. Elst || — || align=right | 11 km || 
|-id=068 bgcolor=#fefefe
| 20068 ||  || — || October 9, 1993 || La Silla || E. W. Elst || — || align=right | 2.8 km || 
|-id=069 bgcolor=#d6d6d6
| 20069 ||  || — || October 9, 1993 || La Silla || E. W. Elst || — || align=right | 7.6 km || 
|-id=070 bgcolor=#fefefe
| 20070 Koichiyuko || 1993 XL ||  || December 8, 1993 || Oizumi || T. Kobayashi || FLO || align=right | 3.5 km || 
|-id=071 bgcolor=#fefefe
| 20071 || 1994 AG || — || January 2, 1994 || Oizumi || T. Kobayashi || — || align=right | 2.5 km || 
|-id=072 bgcolor=#fefefe
| 20072 ||  || — || January 7, 1994 || Oizumi || T. Kobayashi || ERI || align=right | 5.4 km || 
|-id=073 bgcolor=#fefefe
| 20073 Yumiko ||  ||  || January 9, 1994 || Oizumi || T. Kobayashi, H. Fujii || V || align=right | 2.3 km || 
|-id=074 bgcolor=#fefefe
| 20074 Laskerschueler ||  ||  || January 14, 1994 || Tautenburg Observatory || F. Börngen || V || align=right | 2.3 km || 
|-id=075 bgcolor=#fefefe
| 20075 || 1994 BX || — || January 19, 1994 || Oizumi || T. Kobayashi || — || align=right | 2.8 km || 
|-id=076 bgcolor=#fefefe
| 20076 ||  || — || January 23, 1994 || Oizumi || T. Kobayashi || — || align=right | 4.3 km || 
|-id=077 bgcolor=#fefefe
| 20077 ||  || — || February 7, 1994 || La Silla || E. W. Elst || — || align=right | 3.1 km || 
|-id=078 bgcolor=#fefefe
| 20078 ||  || — || February 8, 1994 || La Silla || E. W. Elst || V || align=right | 2.1 km || 
|-id=079 bgcolor=#fefefe
| 20079 || 1994 EP || — || March 4, 1994 || Oizumi || T. Kobayashi || — || align=right | 3.8 km || 
|-id=080 bgcolor=#fefefe
| 20080 Maeharatorakichi ||  ||  || March 7, 1994 || Kitami || K. Endate, K. Watanabe || KLI || align=right | 8.1 km || 
|-id=081 bgcolor=#fefefe
| 20081 Occhialini ||  ||  || March 12, 1994 || Cima Ekar || V. Goretti, M. Tombelli || — || align=right | 4.1 km || 
|-id=082 bgcolor=#fefefe
| 20082 ||  || — || March 9, 1994 || Caussols || E. W. Elst || V || align=right | 2.1 km || 
|-id=083 bgcolor=#fefefe
| 20083 || 1994 GE || — || April 3, 1994 || Oizumi || T. Kobayashi || V || align=right | 2.4 km || 
|-id=084 bgcolor=#fefefe
| 20084 Buckmaster ||  ||  || April 6, 1994 || Palomar || C. S. Shoemaker, D. H. Levy || — || align=right | 5.1 km || 
|-id=085 bgcolor=#E9E9E9
| 20085 || 1994 LC || — || June 1, 1994 || Dynic || A. Sugie || — || align=right | 4.1 km || 
|-id=086 bgcolor=#FFC2E0
| 20086 || 1994 LW || — || June 12, 1994 || Siding Spring || R. H. McNaught || AMO +1km || align=right | 1.6 km || 
|-id=087 bgcolor=#E9E9E9
| 20087 ||  || — || August 10, 1994 || La Silla || E. W. Elst || GEF || align=right | 5.5 km || 
|-id=088 bgcolor=#d6d6d6
| 20088 ||  || — || August 10, 1994 || La Silla || E. W. Elst || KOR || align=right | 5.1 km || 
|-id=089 bgcolor=#d6d6d6
| 20089 ||  || — || August 10, 1994 || La Silla || E. W. Elst || KAR || align=right | 3.0 km || 
|-id=090 bgcolor=#E9E9E9
| 20090 ||  || — || August 10, 1994 || La Silla || E. W. Elst || EUN || align=right | 4.0 km || 
|-id=091 bgcolor=#d6d6d6
| 20091 ||  || — || August 12, 1994 || La Silla || E. W. Elst || KOR || align=right | 4.8 km || 
|-id=092 bgcolor=#d6d6d6
| 20092 ||  || — || August 12, 1994 || La Silla || E. W. Elst || KOR || align=right | 5.3 km || 
|-id=093 bgcolor=#d6d6d6
| 20093 ||  || — || August 12, 1994 || La Silla || E. W. Elst || KOR || align=right | 5.9 km || 
|-id=094 bgcolor=#d6d6d6
| 20094 ||  || — || August 12, 1994 || La Silla || E. W. Elst || — || align=right | 6.2 km || 
|-id=095 bgcolor=#d6d6d6
| 20095 ||  || — || August 10, 1994 || La Silla || E. W. Elst || KAR || align=right | 3.5 km || 
|-id=096 bgcolor=#d6d6d6
| 20096 Shiraishiakihiko || 1994 TZ ||  || October 2, 1994 || Kitami || K. Endate, K. Watanabe || EOS || align=right | 8.2 km || 
|-id=097 bgcolor=#d6d6d6
| 20097 ||  || — || October 31, 1994 || Kushiro || S. Ueda, H. Kaneda || URS || align=right | 20 km || 
|-id=098 bgcolor=#E9E9E9
| 20098 Shibatagenji ||  ||  || November 24, 1994 || Kitami || K. Endate, K. Watanabe || GEF || align=right | 18 km || 
|-id=099 bgcolor=#d6d6d6
| 20099 ||  || — || November 28, 1994 || Kushiro || S. Ueda, H. Kaneda || THM || align=right | 15 km || 
|-id=100 bgcolor=#d6d6d6
| 20100 || 1994 XM || — || December 4, 1994 || Oizumi || T. Kobayashi || THMslow || align=right | 7.4 km || 
|}

20101–20200 

|-bgcolor=#d6d6d6
| 20101 ||  || — || December 1, 1994 || Kitt Peak || Spacewatch || — || align=right | 19 km || 
|-id=102 bgcolor=#d6d6d6
| 20102 Takasago ||  ||  || January 31, 1995 || Geisei || T. Seki || TIR || align=right | 8.1 km || 
|-id=103 bgcolor=#fefefe
| 20103 de Vico || 1995 JK ||  || May 6, 1995 || Cavezzo || R. Calanca || V || align=right | 3.2 km || 
|-id=104 bgcolor=#E9E9E9
| 20104 || 1995 OU || — || July 24, 1995 || Nachi-Katsuura || Y. Shimizu, T. Urata || — || align=right | 3.5 km || 
|-id=105 bgcolor=#fefefe
| 20105 ||  || — || July 19, 1995 || Xinglong || SCAP || — || align=right | 3.5 km || 
|-id=106 bgcolor=#E9E9E9
| 20106 Morton || 1995 QG ||  || August 20, 1995 || NRC-DAO || D. D. Balam || — || align=right | 3.2 km || 
|-id=107 bgcolor=#fefefe
| 20107 Nanyotenmondai ||  ||  || August 28, 1995 || Nanyo || T. Okuni || — || align=right | 3.3 km || 
|-id=108 bgcolor=#C2E0FF
| 20108 ||  || — || August 29, 1995 || Mauna Kea || D. C. Jewitt, J. Chen || plutinocritical || align=right | 125 km || 
|-id=109 bgcolor=#E9E9E9
| 20109 Alicelandis || 1995 RJ ||  || September 12, 1995 || McGraw-Hill || J. L. Tonry || — || align=right | 2.3 km || 
|-id=110 bgcolor=#E9E9E9
| 20110 ||  || — || September 20, 1995 || Kushiro || S. Ueda, H. Kaneda || EUN || align=right | 6.5 km || 
|-id=111 bgcolor=#E9E9E9
| 20111 ||  || — || September 22, 1995 || Siding Spring || R. H. McNaught || — || align=right | 5.0 km || 
|-id=112 bgcolor=#E9E9E9
| 20112 ||  || — || September 20, 1995 || Kitt Peak || Spacewatch || — || align=right | 3.6 km || 
|-id=113 bgcolor=#E9E9E9
| 20113 ||  || — || September 22, 1995 || Kitt Peak || Spacewatch || HNS || align=right | 2.9 km || 
|-id=114 bgcolor=#E9E9E9
| 20114 ||  || — || October 26, 1995 || Nyukasa || M. Hirasawa, S. Suzuki || EUN || align=right | 4.7 km || 
|-id=115 bgcolor=#E9E9E9
| 20115 Niheihajime ||  ||  || November 12, 1995 || Nanyo || T. Okuni || — || align=right | 4.6 km || 
|-id=116 bgcolor=#E9E9E9
| 20116 ||  || — || November 15, 1995 || Oizumi || T. Kobayashi || HEN || align=right | 2.9 km || 
|-id=117 bgcolor=#E9E9E9
| 20117 Tannoakira ||  ||  || November 15, 1995 || Kitami || K. Endate, K. Watanabe || EUN || align=right | 6.1 km || 
|-id=118 bgcolor=#E9E9E9
| 20118 || 1995 WX || — || November 17, 1995 || Oizumi || T. Kobayashi || — || align=right | 6.1 km || 
|-id=119 bgcolor=#E9E9E9
| 20119 ||  || — || November 18, 1995 || Oizumi || T. Kobayashi || GEF || align=right | 3.7 km || 
|-id=120 bgcolor=#E9E9E9
| 20120 Ryugatake ||  ||  || November 24, 1995 || Oizumi || T. Kobayashi || — || align=right | 4.8 km || 
|-id=121 bgcolor=#E9E9E9
| 20121 ||  || — || November 27, 1995 || Oizumi || T. Kobayashi || — || align=right | 5.6 km || 
|-id=122 bgcolor=#E9E9E9
| 20122 ||  || — || November 28, 1995 || Nachi-Katsuura || Y. Shimizu, T. Urata || — || align=right | 3.7 km || 
|-id=123 bgcolor=#d6d6d6
| 20123 ||  || — || November 19, 1995 || Kitt Peak || Spacewatch || — || align=right | 7.2 km || 
|-id=124 bgcolor=#E9E9E9
| 20124 ||  || — || November 21, 1995 || Kitt Peak || Spacewatch || EUN || align=right | 4.9 km || 
|-id=125 bgcolor=#d6d6d6
| 20125 || 1995 YK || — || December 17, 1995 || Oohira || T. Urata || — || align=right | 9.5 km || 
|-id=126 bgcolor=#d6d6d6
| 20126 ||  || — || December 18, 1995 || Kitt Peak || Spacewatch || — || align=right | 6.2 km || 
|-id=127 bgcolor=#d6d6d6
| 20127 ||  || — || December 19, 1995 || Haleakala || NEAT || THM || align=right | 7.1 km || 
|-id=128 bgcolor=#d6d6d6
| 20128 || 1996 AK || — || January 7, 1996 || Haleakala || AMOS || — || align=right | 7.8 km || 
|-id=129 bgcolor=#d6d6d6
| 20129 ||  || — || January 18, 1996 || Oizumi || T. Kobayashi || — || align=right | 8.4 km || 
|-id=130 bgcolor=#d6d6d6
| 20130 ||  || — || January 16, 1996 || Oizumi || T. Kobayashi || EOS || align=right | 7.5 km || 
|-id=131 bgcolor=#d6d6d6
| 20131 ||  || — || January 27, 1996 || Oizumi || T. Kobayashi || EOS || align=right | 7.4 km || 
|-id=132 bgcolor=#E9E9E9
| 20132 ||  || — || January 21, 1996 || Xinglong || SCAP || — || align=right | 3.7 km || 
|-id=133 bgcolor=#d6d6d6
| 20133 ||  || — || February 12, 1996 || Oizumi || T. Kobayashi || EOS || align=right | 8.8 km || 
|-id=134 bgcolor=#d6d6d6
| 20134 ||  || — || April 8, 1996 || Xinglong || SCAP || TIR || align=right | 12 km || 
|-id=135 bgcolor=#d6d6d6
| 20135 Juels || 1996 JC ||  || May 7, 1996 || Prescott || P. G. Comba || THM || align=right | 7.1 km || 
|-id=136 bgcolor=#fefefe
| 20136 Eisenhart || 1996 NA ||  || July 8, 1996 || Prescott || P. G. Comba || H || align=right | 2.2 km || 
|-id=137 bgcolor=#FA8072
| 20137 ||  || — || August 8, 1996 || La Silla || E. W. Elst || — || align=right | 2.5 km || 
|-id=138 bgcolor=#fefefe
| 20138 || 1996 QP || — || August 17, 1996 || Haleakala || NEAT || V || align=right | 1.9 km || 
|-id=139 bgcolor=#fefefe
| 20139 Marianeschi || 1996 QU ||  || August 19, 1996 || Stroncone || A. Vagnozzi || PHO || align=right | 2.7 km || 
|-id=140 bgcolor=#d6d6d6
| 20140 Costitx ||  ||  || August 23, 1996 || Majorca || M. Blasco || — || align=right | 9.8 km || 
|-id=141 bgcolor=#fefefe
| 20141 Markidger ||  ||  || September 13, 1996 || Majorca || M. Blasco || — || align=right | 3.4 km || 
|-id=142 bgcolor=#fefefe
| 20142 ||  || — || September 8, 1996 || Kitt Peak || Spacewatch || FLO || align=right | 2.6 km || 
|-id=143 bgcolor=#fefefe
| 20143 ||  || — || September 13, 1996 || Kitt Peak || Spacewatch || FLO || align=right | 3.0 km || 
|-id=144 bgcolor=#C2FFFF
| 20144 ||  || — || September 15, 1996 || La Silla || UDTS || L4 || align=right | 27 km || 
|-id=145 bgcolor=#fefefe
| 20145 ||  || — || September 20, 1996 || Xinglong || SCAP || — || align=right | 3.2 km || 
|-id=146 bgcolor=#fefefe
| 20146 ||  || — || September 30, 1996 || Uppsala || L. Kamél, K. Lundgren || FLO || align=right | 2.2 km || 
|-id=147 bgcolor=#fefefe
| 20147 ||  || — || September 18, 1996 || Xinglong || SCAP || V || align=right | 2.5 km || 
|-id=148 bgcolor=#fefefe
| 20148 Carducci || 1996 TR ||  || October 4, 1996 || Farra d'Isonzo || Farra d'Isonzo || V || align=right | 2.0 km || 
|-id=149 bgcolor=#fefefe
| 20149 ||  || — || October 8, 1996 || Haleakala || NEAT || — || align=right | 3.0 km || 
|-id=150 bgcolor=#fefefe
| 20150 ||  || — || October 5, 1996 || Xinglong || SCAP || — || align=right | 3.5 km || 
|-id=151 bgcolor=#fefefe
| 20151 Utsunomiya ||  ||  || October 5, 1996 || Kuma Kogen || A. Nakamura || — || align=right | 2.8 km || 
|-id=152 bgcolor=#fefefe
| 20152 ||  || — || October 9, 1996 || Haleakala || NEAT || — || align=right | 2.3 km || 
|-id=153 bgcolor=#fefefe
| 20153 ||  || — || October 12, 1996 || Sudbury || D. di Cicco || — || align=right | 2.6 km || 
|-id=154 bgcolor=#fefefe
| 20154 ||  || — || October 9, 1996 || Kushiro || S. Ueda, H. Kaneda || FLO || align=right | 3.8 km || 
|-id=155 bgcolor=#fefefe
| 20155 Utewindolf ||  ||  || October 13, 1996 || Prescott || P. G. Comba || NYS || align=right | 1.4 km || 
|-id=156 bgcolor=#fefefe
| 20156 Herbwindolf ||  ||  || October 13, 1996 || Prescott || P. G. Comba || — || align=right | 2.6 km || 
|-id=157 bgcolor=#fefefe
| 20157 ||  || — || October 4, 1996 || Kitt Peak || Spacewatch || — || align=right | 2.6 km || 
|-id=158 bgcolor=#fefefe
| 20158 ||  || — || October 5, 1996 || Kitt Peak || Spacewatch || — || align=right | 2.3 km || 
|-id=159 bgcolor=#fefefe
| 20159 ||  || — || October 7, 1996 || Kitt Peak || Spacewatch || — || align=right | 2.2 km || 
|-id=160 bgcolor=#fefefe
| 20160 ||  || — || October 8, 1996 || La Silla || E. W. Elst || — || align=right | 3.1 km || 
|-id=161 bgcolor=#C2E0FF
| 20161 ||  || — || October 8, 1996 || Mauna Kea || D. C. Jewitt, C. Trujillo, J. X. Luu, J. Chen || twotinocritical || align=right | 140 km || 
|-id=162 bgcolor=#fefefe
| 20162 || 1996 UD || — || October 16, 1996 || Oizumi || T. Kobayashi || FLO || align=right | 4.0 km || 
|-id=163 bgcolor=#fefefe
| 20163 || 1996 UG || — || October 16, 1996 || Oizumi || T. Kobayashi || — || align=right | 3.1 km || 
|-id=164 bgcolor=#fefefe
| 20164 Janzajíc ||  ||  || November 9, 1996 || Kleť || J. Tichá, M. Tichý || FLO || align=right | 2.3 km || 
|-id=165 bgcolor=#fefefe
| 20165 ||  || — || November 10, 1996 || Sudbury || D. di Cicco || NYS || align=right | 2.0 km || 
|-id=166 bgcolor=#fefefe
| 20166 ||  || — || November 13, 1996 || Oizumi || T. Kobayashi || — || align=right | 4.7 km || 
|-id=167 bgcolor=#fefefe
| 20167 ||  || — || November 13, 1996 || Oizumi || T. Kobayashi || NYS || align=right | 3.2 km || 
|-id=168 bgcolor=#fefefe
| 20168 ||  || — || November 13, 1996 || Oizumi || T. Kobayashi || KLI || align=right | 6.1 km || 
|-id=169 bgcolor=#fefefe
| 20169 ||  || — || November 4, 1996 || Kitt Peak || Spacewatch || — || align=right | 3.1 km || 
|-id=170 bgcolor=#fefefe
| 20170 ||  || — || November 7, 1996 || Kushiro || S. Ueda, H. Kaneda || — || align=right | 3.8 km || 
|-id=171 bgcolor=#fefefe
| 20171 ||  || — || November 30, 1996 || Dossobuono || L. Lai || — || align=right | 2.3 km || 
|-id=172 bgcolor=#fefefe
| 20172 ||  || — || December 4, 1996 || Kitt Peak || Spacewatch || NYS || align=right | 1.6 km || 
|-id=173 bgcolor=#E9E9E9
| 20173 ||  || — || December 8, 1996 || Oizumi || T. Kobayashi || — || align=right | 2.9 km || 
|-id=174 bgcolor=#fefefe
| 20174 Eisenstein ||  ||  || December 13, 1996 || Prescott || P. G. Comba || — || align=right | 2.5 km || 
|-id=175 bgcolor=#E9E9E9
| 20175 ||  || — || December 7, 1996 || Kitt Peak || Spacewatch || — || align=right | 9.9 km || 
|-id=176 bgcolor=#fefefe
| 20176 ||  || — || December 13, 1996 || Kitt Peak || Spacewatch || — || align=right | 4.0 km || 
|-id=177 bgcolor=#E9E9E9
| 20177 ||  || — || December 13, 1996 || Kitt Peak || Spacewatch || — || align=right | 6.9 km || 
|-id=178 bgcolor=#fefefe
| 20178 ||  || — || December 14, 1996 || Oizumi || T. Kobayashi || — || align=right | 4.0 km || 
|-id=179 bgcolor=#fefefe
| 20179 ||  || — || December 12, 1996 || Xinglong || SCAP || — || align=right | 7.2 km || 
|-id=180 bgcolor=#fefefe
| 20180 Annakolény ||  ||  || December 27, 1996 || Modra || A. Galád, A. Pravda || — || align=right | 3.5 km || 
|-id=181 bgcolor=#fefefe
| 20181 ||  || — || December 22, 1996 || Xinglong || SCAP || — || align=right | 3.1 km || 
|-id=182 bgcolor=#fefefe
| 20182 || 1997 AS || — || January 2, 1997 || Oizumi || T. Kobayashi || — || align=right | 4.0 km || 
|-id=183 bgcolor=#fefefe
| 20183 ||  || — || January 2, 1997 || Oizumi || T. Kobayashi || — || align=right | 3.3 km || 
|-id=184 bgcolor=#E9E9E9
| 20184 ||  || — || January 6, 1997 || Oizumi || T. Kobayashi || EUN || align=right | 5.1 km || 
|-id=185 bgcolor=#E9E9E9
| 20185 ||  || — || January 9, 1997 || Oizumi || T. Kobayashi || — || align=right | 5.0 km || 
|-id=186 bgcolor=#E9E9E9
| 20186 ||  || — || January 2, 1997 || Kitt Peak || Spacewatch || — || align=right | 3.5 km || 
|-id=187 bgcolor=#FA8072
| 20187 Janapittichová ||  ||  || January 14, 1997 || Kleť || M. Tichý || PHO || align=right | 5.2 km || 
|-id=188 bgcolor=#E9E9E9
| 20188 ||  || — || January 15, 1997 || Oizumi || T. Kobayashi || — || align=right | 4.8 km || 
|-id=189 bgcolor=#E9E9E9
| 20189 ||  || — || January 30, 1997 || Oizumi || T. Kobayashi || — || align=right | 2.5 km || 
|-id=190 bgcolor=#E9E9E9
| 20190 ||  || — || January 30, 1997 || Oizumi || T. Kobayashi || — || align=right | 3.3 km || 
|-id=191 bgcolor=#E9E9E9
| 20191 ||  || — || January 31, 1997 || Oizumi || T. Kobayashi || RAF || align=right | 4.0 km || 
|-id=192 bgcolor=#E9E9E9
| 20192 ||  || — || January 31, 1997 || Kitt Peak || Spacewatch || — || align=right | 6.6 km || 
|-id=193 bgcolor=#E9E9E9
| 20193 Yakushima ||  ||  || January 18, 1997 || Chichibu || N. Satō || — || align=right | 12 km || 
|-id=194 bgcolor=#d6d6d6
| 20194 Ilarialocantore ||  ||  || January 30, 1997 || Cima Ekar || M. Tombelli, C. Casacci || KOR || align=right | 4.8 km || 
|-id=195 bgcolor=#E9E9E9
| 20195 Mariovinci ||  ||  || January 30, 1997 || Cima Ekar || U. Munari, M. Tombelli || — || align=right | 4.4 km || 
|-id=196 bgcolor=#E9E9E9
| 20196 ||  || — || February 11, 1997 || Oizumi || T. Kobayashi || EUN || align=right | 4.5 km || 
|-id=197 bgcolor=#E9E9E9
| 20197 Enriques ||  ||  || February 14, 1997 || Prescott || P. G. Comba || EUN || align=right | 3.3 km || 
|-id=198 bgcolor=#E9E9E9
| 20198 ||  || — || February 13, 1997 || Xinglong || SCAP || — || align=right | 2.6 km || 
|-id=199 bgcolor=#E9E9E9
| 20199 || 1997 DR || — || February 28, 1997 || Church Stretton || S. P. Laurie || — || align=right | 5.2 km || 
|-id=200 bgcolor=#E9E9E9
| 20200 Donbacky || 1997 DW ||  || February 28, 1997 || Montelupo || M. Tombelli, G. Forti || GEF || align=right | 4.1 km || 
|}

20201–20300 

|-bgcolor=#E9E9E9
| 20201 ||  || — || March 6, 1997 || Kleť || Kleť Obs. || MAR || align=right | 4.5 km || 
|-id=202 bgcolor=#E9E9E9
| 20202 ||  || — || March 7, 1997 || Kitt Peak || Spacewatch || — || align=right | 6.4 km || 
|-id=203 bgcolor=#E9E9E9
| 20203 ||  || — || March 7, 1997 || Kitt Peak || Spacewatch || — || align=right | 3.4 km || 
|-id=204 bgcolor=#E9E9E9
| 20204 Yuudurunosato ||  ||  || March 1, 1997 || Nanyo || T. Okuni || — || align=right | 6.6 km || 
|-id=205 bgcolor=#E9E9E9
| 20205 Sitanchen ||  ||  || March 4, 1997 || Socorro || LINEAR || — || align=right | 3.8 km || 
|-id=206 bgcolor=#d6d6d6
| 20206 ||  || — || March 31, 1997 || Socorro || LINEAR || URS || align=right | 14 km || 
|-id=207 bgcolor=#d6d6d6
| 20207 Dyckovsky ||  ||  || March 31, 1997 || Socorro || LINEAR || EOS || align=right | 6.1 km || 
|-id=208 bgcolor=#d6d6d6
| 20208 Philiphe ||  ||  || March 31, 1997 || Socorro || LINEAR || EOS || align=right | 6.6 km || 
|-id=209 bgcolor=#d6d6d6
| 20209 ||  || — || March 30, 1997 || Xinglong || SCAP || KOR || align=right | 4.3 km || 
|-id=210 bgcolor=#E9E9E9
| 20210 ||  || — || April 2, 1997 || Socorro || LINEAR || — || align=right | 20 km || 
|-id=211 bgcolor=#d6d6d6
| 20211 Joycegates ||  ||  || April 2, 1997 || Socorro || LINEAR || THM || align=right | 7.5 km || 
|-id=212 bgcolor=#d6d6d6
| 20212 Ekbaltouma ||  ||  || April 3, 1997 || Socorro || LINEAR || — || align=right | 6.4 km || 
|-id=213 bgcolor=#d6d6d6
| 20213 Saurabhsharan ||  ||  || April 5, 1997 || Socorro || LINEAR || KOR || align=right | 5.3 km || 
|-id=214 bgcolor=#d6d6d6
| 20214 Lorikenny ||  ||  || April 6, 1997 || Socorro || LINEAR || — || align=right | 3.8 km || 
|-id=215 bgcolor=#E9E9E9
| 20215 ||  || — || April 7, 1997 || Kitt Peak || Spacewatch || — || align=right | 3.5 km || 
|-id=216 bgcolor=#E9E9E9
| 20216 ||  || — || April 9, 1997 || Xinglong || SCAP || MAR || align=right | 3.4 km || 
|-id=217 bgcolor=#d6d6d6
| 20217 Kathyclemmer ||  ||  || April 3, 1997 || Socorro || LINEAR || — || align=right | 7.3 km || 
|-id=218 bgcolor=#d6d6d6
| 20218 Dukewriter ||  ||  || April 3, 1997 || Socorro || LINEAR || — || align=right | 5.7 km || 
|-id=219 bgcolor=#E9E9E9
| 20219 Brianstone ||  ||  || April 6, 1997 || Socorro || LINEAR || MIT || align=right | 12 km || 
|-id=220 bgcolor=#E9E9E9
| 20220 ||  || — || April 7, 1997 || La Silla || E. W. Elst || — || align=right | 9.6 km || 
|-id=221 bgcolor=#d6d6d6
| 20221 ||  || — || April 30, 1997 || Socorro || LINEAR || THM || align=right | 5.3 km || 
|-id=222 bgcolor=#d6d6d6
| 20222 ||  || — || April 30, 1997 || Socorro || LINEAR || KOR || align=right | 4.6 km || 
|-id=223 bgcolor=#d6d6d6
| 20223 ||  || — || April 30, 1997 || Kitt Peak || Spacewatch || KOR || align=right | 6.1 km || 
|-id=224 bgcolor=#d6d6d6
| 20224 Johnrae ||  ||  || May 3, 1997 || La Silla || E. W. Elst || — || align=right | 13 km || 
|-id=225 bgcolor=#d6d6d6
| 20225 ||  || — || June 26, 1997 || Kitt Peak || Spacewatch || EOS || align=right | 9.3 km || 
|-id=226 bgcolor=#d6d6d6
| 20226 ||  || — || July 11, 1997 || Lake Clear || K. A. Williams || — || align=right | 8.5 km || 
|-id=227 bgcolor=#E9E9E9
| 20227 ||  || — || November 29, 1997 || Socorro || LINEAR || — || align=right | 5.8 km || 
|-id=228 bgcolor=#fefefe
| 20228 Jeanmarcmari || 1997 XG ||  || December 3, 1997 || Caussols || ODAS || — || align=right | 3.3 km || 
|-id=229 bgcolor=#fefefe
| 20229 ||  || — || December 6, 1997 || Caussols || ODAS || — || align=right | 2.4 km || 
|-id=230 bgcolor=#fefefe
| 20230 Blanchard ||  ||  || December 6, 1997 || Caussols || ODAS || — || align=right | 2.3 km || 
|-id=231 bgcolor=#fefefe
| 20231 || 1997 YK || — || December 18, 1997 || Oizumi || T. Kobayashi || Hslow || align=right | 4.4 km || 
|-id=232 bgcolor=#fefefe
| 20232 ||  || — || December 21, 1997 || Oizumi || T. Kobayashi || — || align=right | 2.0 km || 
|-id=233 bgcolor=#fefefe
| 20233 ||  || — || January 5, 1998 || Xinglong || SCAP || — || align=right | 2.8 km || 
|-id=234 bgcolor=#fefefe
| 20234 Billgibson ||  ||  || January 6, 1998 || Anderson Mesa || M. W. Buie || — || align=right | 2.6 km || 
|-id=235 bgcolor=#fefefe
| 20235 ||  || — || January 24, 1998 || Oizumi || T. Kobayashi || NYS || align=right | 6.4 km || 
|-id=236 bgcolor=#FFC2E0
| 20236 ||  || — || January 24, 1998 || Haleakala || NEAT || APO +1km || align=right | 1.0 km || 
|-id=237 bgcolor=#fefefe
| 20237 Clavius ||  ||  || February 6, 1998 || La Silla || E. W. Elst || — || align=right | 3.6 km || 
|-id=238 bgcolor=#fefefe
| 20238 ||  || — || February 23, 1998 || Haleakala || NEAT || — || align=right | 3.9 km || 
|-id=239 bgcolor=#fefefe
| 20239 ||  || — || February 24, 1998 || Kitt Peak || Spacewatch || FLO || align=right | 1.8 km || 
|-id=240 bgcolor=#fefefe
| 20240 ||  || — || February 24, 1998 || Haleakala || NEAT || — || align=right | 3.3 km || 
|-id=241 bgcolor=#fefefe
| 20241 ||  || — || February 27, 1998 || Caussols || ODAS || — || align=right | 2.7 km || 
|-id=242 bgcolor=#fefefe
| 20242 Sagot ||  ||  || February 27, 1998 || Bédoin || P. Antonini || — || align=right | 3.6 km || 
|-id=243 bgcolor=#fefefe
| 20243 Den Bosch ||  ||  || February 25, 1998 || La Silla || E. W. Elst || — || align=right | 5.6 km || 
|-id=244 bgcolor=#fefefe
| 20244 || 1998 EF || — || March 1, 1998 || Oizumi || T. Kobayashi || — || align=right | 3.2 km || 
|-id=245 bgcolor=#fefefe
| 20245 ||  || — || March 1, 1998 || Kitt Peak || Spacewatch || V || align=right | 2.2 km || 
|-id=246 bgcolor=#fefefe
| 20246 Frappa ||  ||  || March 1, 1998 || Caussols || ODAS || FLO || align=right | 2.4 km || 
|-id=247 bgcolor=#fefefe
| 20247 ||  || — || March 2, 1998 || Xinglong || SCAP || V || align=right | 2.6 km || 
|-id=248 bgcolor=#fefefe
| 20248 ||  || — || March 2, 1998 || Xinglong || SCAP || FLO || align=right | 3.4 km || 
|-id=249 bgcolor=#fefefe
| 20249 ||  || — || March 1, 1998 || La Silla || E. W. Elst || — || align=right | 2.6 km || 
|-id=250 bgcolor=#fefefe
| 20250 ||  || — || March 1, 1998 || La Silla || E. W. Elst || — || align=right | 3.0 km || 
|-id=251 bgcolor=#fefefe
| 20251 ||  || — || March 1, 1998 || La Silla || E. W. Elst || NYS || align=right | 2.3 km || 
|-id=252 bgcolor=#fefefe
| 20252 Eyjafjallajökull ||  ||  || March 1, 1998 || La Silla || E. W. Elst || V || align=right | 1.9 km || 
|-id=253 bgcolor=#fefefe
| 20253 ||  || — || March 1, 1998 || Xinglong || SCAP || — || align=right | 2.5 km || 
|-id=254 bgcolor=#E9E9E9
| 20254 Úpice ||  ||  || March 21, 1998 || Ondřejov || P. Pravec || — || align=right | 3.4 km || 
|-id=255 bgcolor=#FFC2E0
| 20255 ||  || — || March 22, 1998 || Socorro || LINEAR || AMO +1km || align=right data-sort-value="0.78" | 780 m || 
|-id=256 bgcolor=#fefefe
| 20256 Adolfneckař ||  ||  || March 23, 1998 || Ondřejov || P. Pravec || — || align=right | 2.1 km || 
|-id=257 bgcolor=#fefefe
| 20257 ||  || — || March 18, 1998 || Kitt Peak || Spacewatch || — || align=right | 3.0 km || 
|-id=258 bgcolor=#fefefe
| 20258 ||  || — || March 24, 1998 || Caussols || ODAS || — || align=right | 2.9 km || 
|-id=259 bgcolor=#fefefe
| 20259 Alanhoffman ||  ||  || March 24, 1998 || Caussols || ODAS || — || align=right | 2.7 km || 
|-id=260 bgcolor=#E9E9E9
| 20260 ||  || — || March 22, 1998 || Oizumi || T. Kobayashi || — || align=right | 4.9 km || 
|-id=261 bgcolor=#E9E9E9
| 20261 ||  || — || March 19, 1998 || Xinglong || SCAP || — || align=right | 6.2 km || 
|-id=262 bgcolor=#E9E9E9
| 20262 ||  || — || March 25, 1998 || Haleakala || NEAT || — || align=right | 10 km || 
|-id=263 bgcolor=#fefefe
| 20263 ||  || — || March 25, 1998 || Gekko || T. Kagawa || NYS || align=right | 3.6 km || 
|-id=264 bgcolor=#fefefe
| 20264 Chauhan ||  ||  || March 20, 1998 || Socorro || LINEAR || MAS || align=right | 3.8 km || 
|-id=265 bgcolor=#fefefe
| 20265 Yuyinchen ||  ||  || March 20, 1998 || Socorro || LINEAR || — || align=right | 2.4 km || 
|-id=266 bgcolor=#fefefe
| 20266 Danielchoi ||  ||  || March 20, 1998 || Socorro || LINEAR || FLO || align=right | 2.6 km || 
|-id=267 bgcolor=#E9E9E9
| 20267 ||  || — || March 20, 1998 || Socorro || LINEAR || — || align=right | 4.7 km || 
|-id=268 bgcolor=#fefefe
| 20268 Racollier ||  ||  || March 20, 1998 || Socorro || LINEAR || V || align=right | 2.5 km || 
|-id=269 bgcolor=#fefefe
| 20269 ||  || — || March 20, 1998 || Socorro || LINEAR || — || align=right | 3.1 km || 
|-id=270 bgcolor=#fefefe
| 20270 Phildeutsch ||  ||  || March 20, 1998 || Socorro || LINEAR || NYS || align=right | 3.1 km || 
|-id=271 bgcolor=#fefefe
| 20271 Allygoldberg ||  ||  || March 20, 1998 || Socorro || LINEAR || — || align=right | 5.9 km || 
|-id=272 bgcolor=#fefefe
| 20272 Duyha ||  ||  || March 20, 1998 || Socorro || LINEAR || — || align=right | 2.5 km || 
|-id=273 bgcolor=#fefefe
| 20273 ||  || — || March 20, 1998 || Socorro || LINEAR || — || align=right | 2.7 km || 
|-id=274 bgcolor=#fefefe
| 20274 Halperin ||  ||  || March 20, 1998 || Socorro || LINEAR || — || align=right | 2.1 km || 
|-id=275 bgcolor=#fefefe
| 20275 ||  || — || March 20, 1998 || Socorro || LINEAR || — || align=right | 3.1 km || 
|-id=276 bgcolor=#fefefe
| 20276 ||  || — || March 20, 1998 || Socorro || LINEAR || — || align=right | 1.6 km || 
|-id=277 bgcolor=#E9E9E9
| 20277 ||  || — || March 20, 1998 || Socorro || LINEAR || EUN || align=right | 4.5 km || 
|-id=278 bgcolor=#fefefe
| 20278 Qileihang ||  ||  || March 20, 1998 || Socorro || LINEAR || NYS || align=right | 1.8 km || 
|-id=279 bgcolor=#fefefe
| 20279 Harel ||  ||  || March 20, 1998 || Socorro || LINEAR || — || align=right | 3.6 km || 
|-id=280 bgcolor=#fefefe
| 20280 ||  || — || March 20, 1998 || Socorro || LINEAR || NYS || align=right | 3.8 km || 
|-id=281 bgcolor=#fefefe
| 20281 Kathartman ||  ||  || March 20, 1998 || Socorro || LINEAR || V || align=right | 3.3 km || 
|-id=282 bgcolor=#fefefe
| 20282 Hedberg ||  ||  || March 20, 1998 || Socorro || LINEAR || FLO || align=right | 1.6 km || 
|-id=283 bgcolor=#E9E9E9
| 20283 Elizaheller ||  ||  || March 20, 1998 || Socorro || LINEAR || — || align=right | 4.1 km || 
|-id=284 bgcolor=#fefefe
| 20284 Andreilevin ||  ||  || March 20, 1998 || Socorro || LINEAR || — || align=right | 2.6 km || 
|-id=285 bgcolor=#fefefe
| 20285 Lubin ||  ||  || March 20, 1998 || Socorro || LINEAR || V || align=right | 2.5 km || 
|-id=286 bgcolor=#fefefe
| 20286 Michta ||  ||  || March 20, 1998 || Socorro || LINEAR || V || align=right | 2.3 km || 
|-id=287 bgcolor=#fefefe
| 20287 Munteanu ||  ||  || March 20, 1998 || Socorro || LINEAR || NYS || align=right | 3.7 km || 
|-id=288 bgcolor=#fefefe
| 20288 Nachbaur ||  ||  || March 20, 1998 || Socorro || LINEAR || NYS || align=right | 5.0 km || 
|-id=289 bgcolor=#fefefe
| 20289 Nettimi ||  ||  || March 20, 1998 || Socorro || LINEAR || V || align=right | 3.2 km || 
|-id=290 bgcolor=#fefefe
| 20290 Seanraj ||  ||  || March 20, 1998 || Socorro || LINEAR || — || align=right | 2.0 km || 
|-id=291 bgcolor=#fefefe
| 20291 Raumurthy ||  ||  || March 20, 1998 || Socorro || LINEAR || NYS || align=right | 2.0 km || 
|-id=292 bgcolor=#fefefe
| 20292 Eduardreznik ||  ||  || March 20, 1998 || Socorro || LINEAR || — || align=right | 2.7 km || 
|-id=293 bgcolor=#fefefe
| 20293 Sirichelson ||  ||  || March 20, 1998 || Socorro || LINEAR || NYS || align=right | 3.9 km || 
|-id=294 bgcolor=#fefefe
| 20294 ||  || — || March 27, 1998 || Caussols || ODAS || V || align=right | 2.1 km || 
|-id=295 bgcolor=#fefefe
| 20295 ||  || — || March 24, 1998 || Socorro || LINEAR || V || align=right | 4.5 km || 
|-id=296 bgcolor=#fefefe
| 20296 Shayestorm ||  ||  || March 24, 1998 || Socorro || LINEAR || FLO || align=right | 2.7 km || 
|-id=297 bgcolor=#E9E9E9
| 20297 ||  || — || March 24, 1998 || Socorro || LINEAR || — || align=right | 8.3 km || 
|-id=298 bgcolor=#E9E9E9
| 20298 Gordonsu ||  ||  || March 24, 1998 || Socorro || LINEAR || — || align=right | 4.9 km || 
|-id=299 bgcolor=#E9E9E9
| 20299 ||  || — || March 24, 1998 || Socorro || LINEAR || — || align=right | 5.2 km || 
|-id=300 bgcolor=#fefefe
| 20300 Arjunsuri ||  ||  || March 24, 1998 || Socorro || LINEAR || V || align=right | 2.7 km || 
|}

20301–20400 

|-bgcolor=#fefefe
| 20301 Thakur ||  ||  || March 31, 1998 || Socorro || LINEAR || — || align=right | 4.1 km || 
|-id=302 bgcolor=#fefefe
| 20302 Kevinwang ||  ||  || March 31, 1998 || Socorro || LINEAR || V || align=right | 3.0 km || 
|-id=303 bgcolor=#fefefe
| 20303 Lindwestrick ||  ||  || March 31, 1998 || Socorro || LINEAR || — || align=right | 3.5 km || 
|-id=304 bgcolor=#fefefe
| 20304 Wolfson ||  ||  || March 31, 1998 || Socorro || LINEAR || — || align=right | 2.9 km || 
|-id=305 bgcolor=#fefefe
| 20305 Feliciayen ||  ||  || March 31, 1998 || Socorro || LINEAR || V || align=right | 2.4 km || 
|-id=306 bgcolor=#E9E9E9
| 20306 Richarnold ||  ||  || March 31, 1998 || Socorro || LINEAR || — || align=right | 2.9 km || 
|-id=307 bgcolor=#fefefe
| 20307 Johnbarnes ||  ||  || March 31, 1998 || Socorro || LINEAR || — || align=right | 3.0 km || 
|-id=308 bgcolor=#fefefe
| 20308 ||  || — || March 31, 1998 || Socorro || LINEAR || V || align=right | 3.3 km || 
|-id=309 bgcolor=#fefefe
| 20309 Batalden ||  ||  || March 31, 1998 || Socorro || LINEAR || — || align=right | 3.8 km || 
|-id=310 bgcolor=#fefefe
| 20310 ||  || — || March 31, 1998 || Socorro || LINEAR || — || align=right | 3.6 km || 
|-id=311 bgcolor=#E9E9E9
| 20311 Nancycarter ||  ||  || March 31, 1998 || Socorro || LINEAR || — || align=right | 2.4 km || 
|-id=312 bgcolor=#fefefe
| 20312 Danahy ||  ||  || March 31, 1998 || Socorro || LINEAR || V || align=right | 3.3 km || 
|-id=313 bgcolor=#E9E9E9
| 20313 Fredrikson ||  ||  || March 20, 1998 || Socorro || LINEAR || — || align=right | 5.1 km || 
|-id=314 bgcolor=#fefefe
| 20314 Johnharrison ||  ||  || March 28, 1998 || Reedy Creek || J. Broughton || — || align=right | 3.8 km || 
|-id=315 bgcolor=#E9E9E9
| 20315 ||  || — || March 22, 1998 || Socorro || LINEAR || — || align=right | 4.0 km || 
|-id=316 bgcolor=#fefefe
| 20316 Jerahalpern ||  ||  || March 28, 1998 || Socorro || LINEAR || NYS || align=right | 2.1 km || 
|-id=317 bgcolor=#E9E9E9
| 20317 Hendrickson ||  ||  || March 29, 1998 || Socorro || LINEAR || — || align=right | 3.9 km || 
|-id=318 bgcolor=#fefefe
| 20318 || 1998 GZ || — || April 3, 1998 || Oohira || T. Urata || V || align=right | 1.8 km || 
|-id=319 bgcolor=#E9E9E9
| 20319 ||  || — || April 5, 1998 || Woomera || F. B. Zoltowski || — || align=right | 6.5 km || 
|-id=320 bgcolor=#E9E9E9
| 20320 ||  || — || April 2, 1998 || Socorro || LINEAR || — || align=right | 9.2 km || 
|-id=321 bgcolor=#fefefe
| 20321 Lightdonovan ||  ||  || April 18, 1998 || Socorro || LINEAR || — || align=right | 2.3 km || 
|-id=322 bgcolor=#fefefe
| 20322 ||  || — || April 20, 1998 || Socorro || LINEAR || — || align=right | 3.4 km || 
|-id=323 bgcolor=#fefefe
| 20323 Tomlindstom ||  ||  || April 20, 1998 || Socorro || LINEAR || — || align=right | 3.3 km || 
|-id=324 bgcolor=#E9E9E9
| 20324 Johnmahoney ||  ||  || April 20, 1998 || Socorro || LINEAR || — || align=right | 2.3 km || 
|-id=325 bgcolor=#fefefe
| 20325 Julianoey ||  ||  || April 21, 1998 || Kitt Peak || Spacewatch || moon || align=right | 4.9 km || 
|-id=326 bgcolor=#E9E9E9
| 20326 ||  || — || April 20, 1998 || Socorro || LINEAR || — || align=right | 7.3 km || 
|-id=327 bgcolor=#d6d6d6
| 20327 ||  || — || April 20, 1998 || Socorro || LINEAR || — || align=right | 8.0 km || 
|-id=328 bgcolor=#E9E9E9
| 20328 ||  || — || April 30, 1998 || Lime Creek || R. Linderholm || — || align=right | 10 km || 
|-id=329 bgcolor=#fefefe
| 20329 Manfro ||  ||  || April 20, 1998 || Socorro || LINEAR || — || align=right | 2.7 km || 
|-id=330 bgcolor=#E9E9E9
| 20330 Manwell ||  ||  || April 20, 1998 || Socorro || LINEAR || — || align=right | 4.7 km || 
|-id=331 bgcolor=#E9E9E9
| 20331 Bijemarks ||  ||  || April 20, 1998 || Socorro || LINEAR || — || align=right | 9.0 km || 
|-id=332 bgcolor=#fefefe
| 20332 ||  || — || April 25, 1998 || Haleakala || NEAT || V || align=right | 2.7 km || 
|-id=333 bgcolor=#fefefe
| 20333 Johannhuth ||  ||  || April 25, 1998 || Anderson Mesa || LONEOS || — || align=right | 3.6 km || 
|-id=334 bgcolor=#fefefe
| 20334 Glewitsky ||  ||  || April 25, 1998 || Anderson Mesa || LONEOS || — || align=right | 2.8 km || 
|-id=335 bgcolor=#E9E9E9
| 20335 Charmartell ||  ||  || April 21, 1998 || Socorro || LINEAR || — || align=right | 2.6 km || 
|-id=336 bgcolor=#E9E9E9
| 20336 Gretamills ||  ||  || April 21, 1998 || Socorro || LINEAR || — || align=right | 5.0 km || 
|-id=337 bgcolor=#fefefe
| 20337 Naeve ||  ||  || April 21, 1998 || Socorro || LINEAR || FLO || align=right | 3.5 km || 
|-id=338 bgcolor=#d6d6d6
| 20338 Elainepappas ||  ||  || April 21, 1998 || Socorro || LINEAR || KOR || align=right | 4.0 km || 
|-id=339 bgcolor=#d6d6d6
| 20339 Eileenreed ||  ||  || April 21, 1998 || Socorro || LINEAR || KOR || align=right | 4.3 km || 
|-id=340 bgcolor=#fefefe
| 20340 Susanruder ||  ||  || April 21, 1998 || Socorro || LINEAR || NYS || align=right | 1.9 km || 
|-id=341 bgcolor=#fefefe
| 20341 Alanstack ||  ||  || April 21, 1998 || Socorro || LINEAR || — || align=right | 3.7 km || 
|-id=342 bgcolor=#E9E9E9
| 20342 Trinh ||  ||  || April 21, 1998 || Socorro || LINEAR || — || align=right | 3.6 km || 
|-id=343 bgcolor=#E9E9E9
| 20343 Vaccariello ||  ||  || April 21, 1998 || Socorro || LINEAR || — || align=right | 3.8 km || 
|-id=344 bgcolor=#fefefe
| 20344 ||  || — || April 25, 1998 || La Silla || E. W. Elst || — || align=right | 2.6 km || 
|-id=345 bgcolor=#fefefe
| 20345 Davidvito ||  ||  || April 23, 1998 || Socorro || LINEAR || V || align=right | 2.8 km || 
|-id=346 bgcolor=#fefefe
| 20346 ||  || — || April 23, 1998 || Socorro || LINEAR || — || align=right | 8.4 km || 
|-id=347 bgcolor=#E9E9E9
| 20347 Wunderlich ||  ||  || April 23, 1998 || Socorro || LINEAR || NEM || align=right | 6.6 km || 
|-id=348 bgcolor=#E9E9E9
| 20348 ||  || — || April 23, 1998 || Socorro || LINEAR || — || align=right | 4.8 km || 
|-id=349 bgcolor=#E9E9E9
| 20349 ||  || — || April 23, 1998 || Socorro || LINEAR || — || align=right | 5.2 km || 
|-id=350 bgcolor=#d6d6d6
| 20350 ||  || — || April 23, 1998 || Socorro || LINEAR || — || align=right | 7.6 km || 
|-id=351 bgcolor=#E9E9E9
| 20351 Kaborchardt ||  ||  || April 18, 1998 || Socorro || LINEAR || — || align=right | 3.8 km || 
|-id=352 bgcolor=#fefefe
| 20352 Pinakibose ||  ||  || April 19, 1998 || Socorro || LINEAR || V || align=right | 1.8 km || 
|-id=353 bgcolor=#E9E9E9
| 20353 ||  || — || April 19, 1998 || Socorro || LINEAR || EUN || align=right | 3.6 km || 
|-id=354 bgcolor=#fefefe
| 20354 Rebeccachan ||  ||  || April 21, 1998 || Socorro || LINEAR || FLO || align=right | 2.9 km || 
|-id=355 bgcolor=#fefefe
| 20355 Saraclark ||  ||  || April 21, 1998 || Socorro || LINEAR || — || align=right | 3.0 km || 
|-id=356 bgcolor=#E9E9E9
| 20356 ||  || — || April 23, 1998 || Socorro || LINEAR || — || align=right | 6.2 km || 
|-id=357 bgcolor=#E9E9E9
| 20357 Shireendhir ||  ||  || April 23, 1998 || Socorro || LINEAR || WIT || align=right | 5.8 km || 
|-id=358 bgcolor=#E9E9E9
| 20358 Dalem ||  ||  || April 25, 1998 || La Silla || E. W. Elst || EUN || align=right | 6.0 km || 
|-id=359 bgcolor=#E9E9E9
| 20359 || 1998 JR || — || May 1, 1998 || Haleakala || NEAT || — || align=right | 4.4 km || 
|-id=360 bgcolor=#fefefe
| 20360 Holsapple ||  ||  || May 1, 1998 || Anderson Mesa || LONEOS || — || align=right | 3.6 km || 
|-id=361 bgcolor=#E9E9E9
| 20361 Romanishin ||  ||  || May 1, 1998 || Anderson Mesa || LONEOS || EUN || align=right | 3.6 km || 
|-id=362 bgcolor=#E9E9E9
| 20362 Trilling ||  ||  || May 1, 1998 || Anderson Mesa || LONEOS || — || align=right | 5.8 km || 
|-id=363 bgcolor=#E9E9E9
| 20363 Komitov ||  ||  || May 18, 1998 || Anderson Mesa || LONEOS || — || align=right | 8.4 km || 
|-id=364 bgcolor=#d6d6d6
| 20364 Zdeněkmiler ||  ||  || May 20, 1998 || Kleť || M. Tichý, Z. Moravec || KOR || align=right | 9.1 km || 
|-id=365 bgcolor=#d6d6d6
| 20365 ||  || — || May 24, 1998 || Woomera || F. B. Zoltowski || EOS || align=right | 8.9 km || 
|-id=366 bgcolor=#E9E9E9
| 20366 Bonev ||  ||  || May 23, 1998 || Anderson Mesa || LONEOS || — || align=right | 5.8 km || 
|-id=367 bgcolor=#E9E9E9
| 20367 Erikagibb ||  ||  || May 23, 1998 || Anderson Mesa || LONEOS || DOR || align=right | 9.6 km || 
|-id=368 bgcolor=#E9E9E9
| 20368 ||  || — || May 27, 1998 || Lake Clear || K. A. Williams || — || align=right | 7.4 km || 
|-id=369 bgcolor=#E9E9E9
| 20369 ||  || — || May 22, 1998 || Socorro || LINEAR || WAT || align=right | 11 km || 
|-id=370 bgcolor=#E9E9E9
| 20370 ||  || — || May 22, 1998 || Socorro || LINEAR || PAD || align=right | 7.7 km || 
|-id=371 bgcolor=#E9E9E9
| 20371 Ekladyous ||  ||  || May 22, 1998 || Socorro || LINEAR || slow || align=right | 7.9 km || 
|-id=372 bgcolor=#fefefe
| 20372 Juliafanning ||  ||  || May 22, 1998 || Socorro || LINEAR || — || align=right | 3.2 km || 
|-id=373 bgcolor=#E9E9E9
| 20373 Fullmer ||  ||  || May 22, 1998 || Socorro || LINEAR || — || align=right | 4.5 km || 
|-id=374 bgcolor=#d6d6d6
| 20374 ||  || — || May 22, 1998 || Socorro || LINEAR || — || align=right | 6.3 km || 
|-id=375 bgcolor=#E9E9E9
| 20375 Sherrigerten ||  ||  || May 22, 1998 || Socorro || LINEAR || — || align=right | 7.7 km || 
|-id=376 bgcolor=#fefefe
| 20376 Joyhines ||  ||  || May 22, 1998 || Socorro || LINEAR || MAS || align=right | 2.6 km || 
|-id=377 bgcolor=#fefefe
| 20377 Jakubisin ||  ||  || May 22, 1998 || Socorro || LINEAR || NYS || align=right | 2.6 km || 
|-id=378 bgcolor=#E9E9E9
| 20378 ||  || — || May 22, 1998 || Socorro || LINEAR || MAR || align=right | 8.0 km || 
|-id=379 bgcolor=#E9E9E9
| 20379 Christijohns ||  ||  || May 22, 1998 || Socorro || LINEAR || — || align=right | 7.0 km || 
|-id=380 bgcolor=#E9E9E9
| 20380 ||  || — || May 22, 1998 || Socorro || LINEAR || — || align=right | 5.7 km || 
|-id=381 bgcolor=#fefefe
| 20381 ||  || — || May 22, 1998 || Socorro || LINEAR || — || align=right | 4.7 km || 
|-id=382 bgcolor=#d6d6d6
| 20382 ||  || — || May 23, 1998 || Socorro || LINEAR || — || align=right | 5.6 km || 
|-id=383 bgcolor=#d6d6d6
| 20383 ||  || — || May 23, 1998 || Socorro || LINEAR || — || align=right | 9.1 km || 
|-id=384 bgcolor=#E9E9E9
| 20384 ||  || — || May 23, 1998 || Socorro || LINEAR || — || align=right | 5.2 km || 
|-id=385 bgcolor=#E9E9E9
| 20385 ||  || — || May 23, 1998 || Socorro || LINEAR || GEF || align=right | 6.1 km || 
|-id=386 bgcolor=#d6d6d6
| 20386 ||  || — || May 23, 1998 || Socorro || LINEAR || — || align=right | 10 km || 
|-id=387 bgcolor=#E9E9E9
| 20387 ||  || — || May 23, 1998 || Socorro || LINEAR || — || align=right | 11 km || 
|-id=388 bgcolor=#d6d6d6
| 20388 ||  || — || May 23, 1998 || Socorro || LINEAR || — || align=right | 7.8 km || 
|-id=389 bgcolor=#d6d6d6
| 20389 ||  || — || May 23, 1998 || Socorro || LINEAR || EOS || align=right | 9.6 km || 
|-id=390 bgcolor=#E9E9E9
| 20390 ||  || — || May 23, 1998 || Socorro || LINEAR || — || align=right | 4.7 km || 
|-id=391 bgcolor=#E9E9E9
| 20391 ||  || — || May 23, 1998 || Socorro || LINEAR || — || align=right | 10 km || 
|-id=392 bgcolor=#d6d6d6
| 20392 Mikeshepard ||  ||  || June 19, 1998 || Anderson Mesa || LONEOS || FIR || align=right | 12 km || 
|-id=393 bgcolor=#d6d6d6
| 20393 Kevinlane ||  ||  || June 19, 1998 || Socorro || LINEAR || — || align=right | 5.5 km || 
|-id=394 bgcolor=#d6d6d6
| 20394 Fatou ||  ||  || June 28, 1998 || Prescott || P. G. Comba || slow || align=right | 10 km || 
|-id=395 bgcolor=#d6d6d6
| 20395 ||  || — || June 24, 1998 || Socorro || LINEAR || BRA || align=right | 16 km || 
|-id=396 bgcolor=#E9E9E9
| 20396 ||  || — || June 24, 1998 || Socorro || LINEAR || — || align=right | 5.4 km || 
|-id=397 bgcolor=#d6d6d6
| 20397 ||  || — || June 24, 1998 || Socorro || LINEAR || KOR || align=right | 5.7 km || 
|-id=398 bgcolor=#E9E9E9
| 20398 || 1998 NQ || — || July 11, 1998 || Woomera || F. B. Zoltowski || MAR || align=right | 2.7 km || 
|-id=399 bgcolor=#d6d6d6
| 20399 Michaelesser || 1998 OO ||  || July 20, 1998 || Caussols || ODAS || HYG || align=right | 8.4 km || 
|-id=400 bgcolor=#fefefe
| 20400 ||  || — || July 24, 1998 || Caussols || ODAS || — || align=right | 1.9 km || 
|}

20401–20500 

|-bgcolor=#E9E9E9
| 20401 ||  || — || July 21, 1998 || Socorro || LINEAR || — || align=right | 4.7 km || 
|-id=402 bgcolor=#d6d6d6
| 20402 ||  || — || July 31, 1998 || Višnjan Observatory || Višnjan Obs. || — || align=right | 14 km || 
|-id=403 bgcolor=#d6d6d6
| 20403 Attenborough ||  ||  || July 22, 1998 || Reedy Creek || J. Broughton || EOS || align=right | 7.3 km || 
|-id=404 bgcolor=#E9E9E9
| 20404 ||  || — || July 26, 1998 || La Silla || E. W. Elst || — || align=right | 5.0 km || 
|-id=405 bgcolor=#E9E9E9
| 20405 Barryburke ||  ||  || August 24, 1998 || Caussols || ODAS || — || align=right | 3.4 km || 
|-id=406 bgcolor=#d6d6d6
| 20406 ||  || — || August 17, 1998 || Socorro || LINEAR || — || align=right | 5.3 km || 
|-id=407 bgcolor=#d6d6d6
| 20407 ||  || — || August 17, 1998 || Socorro || LINEAR || — || align=right | 15 km || 
|-id=408 bgcolor=#fefefe
| 20408 ||  || — || August 17, 1998 || Socorro || LINEAR || — || align=right | 3.0 km || 
|-id=409 bgcolor=#d6d6d6
| 20409 ||  || — || August 17, 1998 || Socorro || LINEAR || — || align=right | 14 km || 
|-id=410 bgcolor=#d6d6d6
| 20410 ||  || — || August 17, 1998 || Socorro || LINEAR || HYG || align=right | 13 km || 
|-id=411 bgcolor=#d6d6d6
| 20411 ||  || — || August 24, 1998 || Socorro || LINEAR || URS || align=right | 11 km || 
|-id=412 bgcolor=#d6d6d6
| 20412 ||  || — || August 24, 1998 || Socorro || LINEAR || EOS || align=right | 12 km || 
|-id=413 bgcolor=#fefefe
| 20413 ||  || — || August 28, 1998 || Socorro || LINEAR || — || align=right | 2.3 km || 
|-id=414 bgcolor=#d6d6d6
| 20414 ||  || — || September 9, 1998 || Caussols || ODAS || — || align=right | 8.1 km || 
|-id=415 bgcolor=#fefefe
| 20415 Amandalu ||  ||  || September 14, 1998 || Socorro || LINEAR || FLO || align=right | 3.3 km || 
|-id=416 bgcolor=#E9E9E9
| 20416 Mansour ||  ||  || September 14, 1998 || Socorro || LINEAR || — || align=right | 5.8 km || 
|-id=417 bgcolor=#E9E9E9
| 20417 ||  || — || September 20, 1998 || Kitt Peak || Spacewatch || — || align=right | 8.3 km || 
|-id=418 bgcolor=#fefefe
| 20418 ||  || — || September 21, 1998 || La Silla || E. W. Elst || NYS || align=right | 2.1 km || 
|-id=419 bgcolor=#fefefe
| 20419 ||  || — || September 26, 1998 || Socorro || LINEAR || — || align=right | 4.5 km || 
|-id=420 bgcolor=#E9E9E9
| 20420 Marashwhitman ||  ||  || September 26, 1998 || Socorro || LINEAR || — || align=right | 4.4 km || 
|-id=421 bgcolor=#fefefe
| 20421 ||  || — || October 14, 1998 || Socorro || LINEAR || PHO || align=right | 4.7 km || 
|-id=422 bgcolor=#d6d6d6
| 20422 ||  || — || October 23, 1998 || Višnjan Observatory || K. Korlević || THM || align=right | 13 km || 
|-id=423 bgcolor=#E9E9E9
| 20423 ||  || — || November 10, 1998 || Socorro || LINEAR || — || align=right | 7.2 km || 
|-id=424 bgcolor=#C2FFFF
| 20424 ||  || — || November 10, 1998 || Socorro || LINEAR || L4 || align=right | 46 km || 
|-id=425 bgcolor=#FFC2E0
| 20425 ||  || — || November 15, 1998 || Kitt Peak || Spacewatch || APOPHAcritical || align=right data-sort-value="0.30" | 300 m || 
|-id=426 bgcolor=#d6d6d6
| 20426 Fridlund ||  ||  || November 13, 1998 || La Silla || C.-I. Lagerkvist || — || align=right | 13 km || 
|-id=427 bgcolor=#d6d6d6
| 20427 Hjalmar ||  ||  || November 13, 1998 || La Silla || C.-I. Lagerkvist || ALA || align=right | 18 km || 
|-id=428 bgcolor=#C2FFFF
| 20428 ||  || — || November 18, 1998 || Socorro || LINEAR || L4 || align=right | 27 km || 
|-id=429 bgcolor=#FFC2E0
| 20429 ||  || — || December 16, 1998 || Socorro || LINEAR || APO +1km || align=right | 1.1 km || 
|-id=430 bgcolor=#E9E9E9
| 20430 Stout ||  ||  || January 10, 1999 || Baton Rouge || W. R. Cooney Jr., S. Lazar || — || align=right | 3.4 km || 
|-id=431 bgcolor=#fefefe
| 20431 ||  || — || January 13, 1999 || Višnjan Observatory || K. Korlević || — || align=right | 2.5 km || 
|-id=432 bgcolor=#fefefe
| 20432 ||  || — || January 22, 1999 || Oizumi || T. Kobayashi || KLI || align=right | 7.6 km || 
|-id=433 bgcolor=#d6d6d6
| 20433 Prestinenza ||  ||  || February 14, 1999 || Ceccano || G. Masi || URS || align=right | 11 km || 
|-id=434 bgcolor=#E9E9E9
| 20434 ||  || — || March 21, 1999 || Višnjan Observatory || K. Korlević || EUN || align=right | 9.3 km || 
|-id=435 bgcolor=#fefefe
| 20435 ||  || — || March 19, 1999 || Socorro || LINEAR || — || align=right | 4.2 km || 
|-id=436 bgcolor=#fefefe
| 20436 ||  || — || April 12, 1999 || Socorro || LINEAR || — || align=right | 2.7 km || 
|-id=437 bgcolor=#fefefe
| 20437 Selohusa ||  ||  || May 8, 1999 || Catalina || CSS || V || align=right | 2.7 km || 
|-id=438 bgcolor=#fefefe
| 20438 ||  || — || May 10, 1999 || Socorro || LINEAR || — || align=right | 3.5 km || 
|-id=439 bgcolor=#fefefe
| 20439 ||  || — || May 10, 1999 || Socorro || LINEAR || NYS || align=right | 4.5 km || 
|-id=440 bgcolor=#fefefe
| 20440 McClintock ||  ||  || May 10, 1999 || Socorro || LINEAR || MAS || align=right | 3.7 km || 
|-id=441 bgcolor=#fefefe
| 20441 Elijahmena ||  ||  || May 10, 1999 || Socorro || LINEAR || FLO || align=right | 2.7 km || 
|-id=442 bgcolor=#fefefe
| 20442 ||  || — || May 10, 1999 || Socorro || LINEAR || — || align=right | 2.7 km || 
|-id=443 bgcolor=#fefefe
| 20443 ||  || — || May 10, 1999 || Socorro || LINEAR || — || align=right | 5.5 km || 
|-id=444 bgcolor=#fefefe
| 20444 Mamesser ||  ||  || May 10, 1999 || Socorro || LINEAR || FLO || align=right | 2.5 km || 
|-id=445 bgcolor=#fefefe
| 20445 ||  || — || May 12, 1999 || Socorro || LINEAR || — || align=right | 6.5 km || 
|-id=446 bgcolor=#FA8072
| 20446 ||  || — || May 14, 1999 || Socorro || LINEAR || — || align=right | 4.8 km || 
|-id=447 bgcolor=#E9E9E9
| 20447 ||  || — || May 15, 1999 || Socorro || LINEAR || MIT || align=right | 8.0 km || 
|-id=448 bgcolor=#E9E9E9
| 20448 ||  || — || May 12, 1999 || Socorro || LINEAR || EUN || align=right | 3.0 km || 
|-id=449 bgcolor=#fefefe
| 20449 ||  || — || May 13, 1999 || Socorro || LINEAR || NYS || align=right | 2.8 km || 
|-id=450 bgcolor=#fefefe
| 20450 Marymohammed ||  ||  || May 13, 1999 || Socorro || LINEAR || FLO || align=right | 2.0 km || 
|-id=451 bgcolor=#fefefe
| 20451 Galeotti ||  ||  || May 15, 1999 || Anderson Mesa || LONEOS || — || align=right | 3.5 km || 
|-id=452 bgcolor=#fefefe
| 20452 ||  || — || May 20, 1999 || Socorro || LINEAR || — || align=right | 4.4 km || 
|-id=453 bgcolor=#fefefe
| 20453 ||  || — || May 24, 1999 || Socorro || LINEAR || PHO || align=right | 3.1 km || 
|-id=454 bgcolor=#fefefe
| 20454 Pedrajo ||  ||  || June 9, 1999 || Socorro || LINEAR || V || align=right | 2.7 km || 
|-id=455 bgcolor=#fefefe
| 20455 Pennell ||  ||  || June 9, 1999 || Socorro || LINEAR || V || align=right | 2.8 km || 
|-id=456 bgcolor=#d6d6d6
| 20456 ||  || — || June 8, 1999 || Kitt Peak || Spacewatch || — || align=right | 7.7 km || 
|-id=457 bgcolor=#E9E9E9
| 20457 ||  || — || June 10, 1999 || Woomera || F. B. Zoltowski || — || align=right | 4.6 km || 
|-id=458 bgcolor=#fefefe
| 20458 ||  || — || June 9, 1999 || Socorro || LINEAR || — || align=right | 3.5 km || 
|-id=459 bgcolor=#E9E9E9
| 20459 ||  || — || June 9, 1999 || Socorro || LINEAR || — || align=right | 4.4 km || 
|-id=460 bgcolor=#FFC2E0
| 20460 Robwhiteley ||  ||  || June 13, 1999 || CSS || CSS || AMO +1km || align=right | 2.7 km || 
|-id=461 bgcolor=#C7FF8F
| 20461 Dioretsa ||  ||  || June 8, 1999 || Socorro || LINEAR || damocloidunusualcritical || align=right | 7.7 km || 
|-id=462 bgcolor=#d6d6d6
| 20462 ||  || — || June 14, 1999 || Kitt Peak || Spacewatch || EOS || align=right | 7.7 km || 
|-id=463 bgcolor=#fefefe
| 20463 ||  || — || June 23, 1999 || Woomera || F. B. Zoltowski || V || align=right | 2.7 km || 
|-id=464 bgcolor=#fefefe
| 20464 ||  || — || June 24, 1999 || Woomera || F. B. Zoltowski || FLO || align=right | 2.2 km || 
|-id=465 bgcolor=#fefefe
| 20465 Vervack ||  ||  || June 20, 1999 || Anderson Mesa || LONEOS || — || align=right | 3.4 km || 
|-id=466 bgcolor=#E9E9E9
| 20466 ||  || — || June 20, 1999 || Catalina || CSS || — || align=right | 14 km || 
|-id=467 bgcolor=#fefefe
| 20467 Hibbitts ||  ||  || June 20, 1999 || Anderson Mesa || LONEOS || — || align=right | 4.2 km || 
|-id=468 bgcolor=#d6d6d6
| 20468 Petercook ||  ||  || July 13, 1999 || Reedy Creek || J. Broughton || — || align=right | 7.9 km || 
|-id=469 bgcolor=#d6d6d6
| 20469 Dudleymoore ||  ||  || July 13, 1999 || Reedy Creek || J. Broughton || — || align=right | 5.7 km || 
|-id=470 bgcolor=#fefefe
| 20470 ||  || — || July 13, 1999 || Socorro || LINEAR || — || align=right | 10 km || 
|-id=471 bgcolor=#E9E9E9
| 20471 ||  || — || July 13, 1999 || Socorro || LINEAR || — || align=right | 5.3 km || 
|-id=472 bgcolor=#fefefe
| 20472 Mollypettit ||  ||  || July 13, 1999 || Socorro || LINEAR || NYS || align=right | 5.4 km || 
|-id=473 bgcolor=#E9E9E9
| 20473 ||  || — || July 13, 1999 || Socorro || LINEAR || EUN || align=right | 6.3 km || 
|-id=474 bgcolor=#fefefe
| 20474 Reasoner ||  ||  || July 13, 1999 || Socorro || LINEAR || — || align=right | 2.8 km || 
|-id=475 bgcolor=#E9E9E9
| 20475 ||  || — || July 13, 1999 || Socorro || LINEAR || — || align=right | 3.7 km || 
|-id=476 bgcolor=#fefefe
| 20476 Chanarich ||  ||  || July 13, 1999 || Socorro || LINEAR || — || align=right | 2.4 km || 
|-id=477 bgcolor=#fefefe
| 20477 Anastroda ||  ||  || July 14, 1999 || Socorro || LINEAR || V || align=right | 2.7 km || 
|-id=478 bgcolor=#E9E9E9
| 20478 Rutenberg ||  ||  || July 14, 1999 || Socorro || LINEAR || — || align=right | 3.7 km || 
|-id=479 bgcolor=#fefefe
| 20479 Celisaucier ||  ||  || July 14, 1999 || Socorro || LINEAR || — || align=right | 3.5 km || 
|-id=480 bgcolor=#fefefe
| 20480 Antonschraut ||  ||  || July 14, 1999 || Socorro || LINEAR || MAS || align=right | 3.2 km || 
|-id=481 bgcolor=#fefefe
| 20481 Sharples ||  ||  || July 14, 1999 || Socorro || LINEAR || — || align=right | 3.3 km || 
|-id=482 bgcolor=#fefefe
| 20482 Dustinshea ||  ||  || July 14, 1999 || Socorro || LINEAR || NYS || align=right | 2.9 km || 
|-id=483 bgcolor=#fefefe
| 20483 Sinay ||  ||  || July 14, 1999 || Socorro || LINEAR || — || align=right | 3.3 km || 
|-id=484 bgcolor=#E9E9E9
| 20484 Janetsong ||  ||  || July 14, 1999 || Socorro || LINEAR || — || align=right | 4.2 km || 
|-id=485 bgcolor=#E9E9E9
| 20485 ||  || — || July 12, 1999 || Socorro || LINEAR || EUN || align=right | 4.3 km || 
|-id=486 bgcolor=#E9E9E9
| 20486 ||  || — || July 12, 1999 || Socorro || LINEAR || — || align=right | 6.7 km || 
|-id=487 bgcolor=#E9E9E9
| 20487 ||  || — || July 13, 1999 || Socorro || LINEAR || — || align=right | 4.6 km || 
|-id=488 bgcolor=#E9E9E9
| 20488 Pic-du-Midi || 1999 OL ||  || July 17, 1999 || Pises || Pises Obs. || — || align=right | 7.9 km || 
|-id=489 bgcolor=#E9E9E9
| 20489 ||  || — || July 22, 1999 || Socorro || LINEAR || EUN || align=right | 6.9 km || 
|-id=490 bgcolor=#E9E9E9
| 20490 ||  || — || July 22, 1999 || Socorro || LINEAR || HNS || align=right | 7.8 km || 
|-id=491 bgcolor=#fefefe
| 20491 Ericstrege ||  ||  || July 16, 1999 || Socorro || LINEAR || — || align=right | 2.9 km || 
|-id=492 bgcolor=#E9E9E9
| 20492 ||  || — || July 16, 1999 || Socorro || LINEAR || — || align=right | 5.1 km || 
|-id=493 bgcolor=#E9E9E9
| 20493 ||  || — || July 16, 1999 || Socorro || LINEAR || — || align=right | 9.1 km || 
|-id=494 bgcolor=#E9E9E9
| 20494 ||  || — || August 3, 1999 || Siding Spring || R. H. McNaught || BRU || align=right | 8.7 km || 
|-id=495 bgcolor=#E9E9E9
| 20495 Rimavská Sobota ||  ||  || August 15, 1999 || Ondřejov || P. Pravec, P. Kušnirák || — || align=right | 3.8 km || 
|-id=496 bgcolor=#d6d6d6
| 20496 Jeník ||  ||  || August 22, 1999 || Ondřejov || L. Kotková || — || align=right | 5.3 km || 
|-id=497 bgcolor=#d6d6d6
| 20497 Mařenka || 1999 RS ||  || September 4, 1999 || Ondřejov || L. Kotková || VER || align=right | 8.7 km || 
|-id=498 bgcolor=#E9E9E9
| 20498 ||  || — || September 5, 1999 || Višnjan Observatory || K. Korlević || — || align=right | 5.2 km || 
|-id=499 bgcolor=#d6d6d6
| 20499 ||  || — || September 6, 1999 || Višnjan Observatory || K. Korlević || KOR || align=right | 4.2 km || 
|-id=500 bgcolor=#fefefe
| 20500 Avner ||  ||  || September 4, 1999 || Catalina || CSS || FLO || align=right | 3.0 km || 
|}

20501–20600 

|-bgcolor=#E9E9E9
| 20501 ||  || — || September 7, 1999 || Socorro || LINEAR || — || align=right | 3.2 km || 
|-id=502 bgcolor=#E9E9E9
| 20502 ||  || — || September 7, 1999 || Socorro || LINEAR || — || align=right | 14 km || 
|-id=503 bgcolor=#d6d6d6
| 20503 Adamtazi ||  ||  || September 7, 1999 || Socorro || LINEAR || — || align=right | 9.2 km || 
|-id=504 bgcolor=#E9E9E9
| 20504 ||  || — || September 7, 1999 || Socorro || LINEAR || EUN || align=right | 4.2 km || 
|-id=505 bgcolor=#d6d6d6
| 20505 ||  || — || September 7, 1999 || Socorro || LINEAR || — || align=right | 11 km || 
|-id=506 bgcolor=#E9E9E9
| 20506 ||  || — || September 7, 1999 || Socorro || LINEAR || MIT || align=right | 6.7 km || 
|-id=507 bgcolor=#fefefe
| 20507 ||  || — || September 7, 1999 || Socorro || LINEAR || — || align=right | 3.0 km || 
|-id=508 bgcolor=#fefefe
| 20508 ||  || — || September 7, 1999 || Socorro || LINEAR || — || align=right | 5.7 km || 
|-id=509 bgcolor=#d6d6d6
| 20509 ||  || — || September 7, 1999 || Socorro || LINEAR || HYG || align=right | 9.9 km || 
|-id=510 bgcolor=#d6d6d6
| 20510 ||  || — || September 7, 1999 || Socorro || LINEAR || EMA || align=right | 11 km || 
|-id=511 bgcolor=#fefefe
| 20511 ||  || — || September 8, 1999 || Višnjan Observatory || K. Korlević || — || align=right | 3.5 km || 
|-id=512 bgcolor=#d6d6d6
| 20512 Rothenberg ||  ||  || September 10, 1999 || Drebach || A. Knöfel || EOS || align=right | 6.9 km || 
|-id=513 bgcolor=#E9E9E9
| 20513 Lazio ||  ||  || September 10, 1999 || Campo Catino || F. Mallia, G. Masi || — || align=right | 2.6 km || 
|-id=514 bgcolor=#d6d6d6
| 20514 ||  || — || September 7, 1999 || Višnjan Observatory || K. Korlević || ANF || align=right | 5.0 km || 
|-id=515 bgcolor=#d6d6d6
| 20515 ||  || — || September 11, 1999 || Višnjan Observatory || K. Korlević || EOS || align=right | 9.4 km || 
|-id=516 bgcolor=#d6d6d6
| 20516 ||  || — || September 11, 1999 || Višnjan Observatory || K. Korlević || KOR || align=right | 5.5 km || 
|-id=517 bgcolor=#E9E9E9
| 20517 Judycrystal ||  ||  || September 11, 1999 || Olathe || L. Robinson || HNS || align=right | 3.7 km || 
|-id=518 bgcolor=#d6d6d6
| 20518 Rendtel ||  ||  || September 12, 1999 || Drebach || A. Knöfel || — || align=right | 12 km || 
|-id=519 bgcolor=#d6d6d6
| 20519 ||  || — || September 12, 1999 || Višnjan Observatory || K. Korlević || — || align=right | 9.7 km || 
|-id=520 bgcolor=#E9E9E9
| 20520 ||  || — || September 13, 1999 || Višnjan Observatory || K. Korlević || EUN || align=right | 12 km || 
|-id=521 bgcolor=#d6d6d6
| 20521 ||  || — || September 13, 1999 || Višnjan Observatory || K. Korlević || VER || align=right | 11 km || 
|-id=522 bgcolor=#fefefe
| 20522 Yogeshwar ||  ||  || September 13, 1999 || Drebach || A. Knöfel || — || align=right | 3.6 km || 
|-id=523 bgcolor=#d6d6d6
| 20523 ||  || — || September 13, 1999 || Višnjan Observatory || K. Korlević || VER || align=right | 18 km || 
|-id=524 bgcolor=#E9E9E9
| 20524 Bustersikes ||  ||  || September 13, 1999 || Fountain Hills || C. W. Juels || GEF || align=right | 7.1 km || 
|-id=525 bgcolor=#E9E9E9
| 20525 ||  || — || September 14, 1999 || Višnjan Observatory || K. Korlević || — || align=right | 11 km || 
|-id=526 bgcolor=#fefefe
| 20526 Bathompson ||  ||  || September 7, 1999 || Socorro || LINEAR || FLO || align=right | 2.1 km || 
|-id=527 bgcolor=#fefefe
| 20527 Dajowestrich ||  ||  || September 7, 1999 || Socorro || LINEAR || NYS || align=right | 2.9 km || 
|-id=528 bgcolor=#d6d6d6
| 20528 Kyleyawn ||  ||  || September 7, 1999 || Socorro || LINEAR || KOR || align=right | 4.7 km || 
|-id=529 bgcolor=#fefefe
| 20529 Zwerling ||  ||  || September 7, 1999 || Socorro || LINEAR || — || align=right | 2.8 km || 
|-id=530 bgcolor=#d6d6d6
| 20530 Johnayres ||  ||  || September 7, 1999 || Socorro || LINEAR || THM || align=right | 7.0 km || 
|-id=531 bgcolor=#fefefe
| 20531 Stevebabcock ||  ||  || September 7, 1999 || Socorro || LINEAR || NYS || align=right | 3.6 km || 
|-id=532 bgcolor=#E9E9E9
| 20532 Benbilby ||  ||  || September 7, 1999 || Socorro || LINEAR || — || align=right | 3.6 km || 
|-id=533 bgcolor=#d6d6d6
| 20533 Irmabonham ||  ||  || September 7, 1999 || Socorro || LINEAR || KOR || align=right | 5.3 km || 
|-id=534 bgcolor=#E9E9E9
| 20534 Bozeman ||  ||  || September 7, 1999 || Socorro || LINEAR || — || align=right | 2.4 km || 
|-id=535 bgcolor=#fefefe
| 20535 Marshburrows ||  ||  || September 7, 1999 || Socorro || LINEAR || — || align=right | 3.2 km || 
|-id=536 bgcolor=#fefefe
| 20536 Tracicarter ||  ||  || September 7, 1999 || Socorro || LINEAR || NYS || align=right | 2.2 km || 
|-id=537 bgcolor=#fefefe
| 20537 Sandraderosa ||  ||  || September 7, 1999 || Socorro || LINEAR || V || align=right | 2.6 km || 
|-id=538 bgcolor=#fefefe
| 20538 ||  || — || September 7, 1999 || Socorro || LINEAR || — || align=right | 3.6 km || 
|-id=539 bgcolor=#d6d6d6
| 20539 Gadberry ||  ||  || September 7, 1999 || Socorro || LINEAR || KOR || align=right | 4.6 km || 
|-id=540 bgcolor=#E9E9E9
| 20540 Marhalpern ||  ||  || September 7, 1999 || Socorro || LINEAR || PAD || align=right | 6.9 km || 
|-id=541 bgcolor=#E9E9E9
| 20541 ||  || — || September 7, 1999 || Socorro || LINEAR || — || align=right | 6.5 km || 
|-id=542 bgcolor=#E9E9E9
| 20542 ||  || — || September 7, 1999 || Socorro || LINEAR || — || align=right | 5.3 km || 
|-id=543 bgcolor=#d6d6d6
| 20543 ||  || — || September 7, 1999 || Socorro || LINEAR || ALA || align=right | 18 km || 
|-id=544 bgcolor=#fefefe
| 20544 Kimhansell ||  ||  || September 8, 1999 || Socorro || LINEAR || — || align=right | 2.4 km || 
|-id=545 bgcolor=#fefefe
| 20545 Karenhowell ||  ||  || September 8, 1999 || Socorro || LINEAR || — || align=right | 3.1 km || 
|-id=546 bgcolor=#d6d6d6
| 20546 ||  || — || September 8, 1999 || Socorro || LINEAR || HYG || align=right | 11 km || 
|-id=547 bgcolor=#d6d6d6
| 20547 ||  || — || September 8, 1999 || Socorro || LINEAR || HYG || align=right | 11 km || 
|-id=548 bgcolor=#d6d6d6
| 20548 ||  || — || September 8, 1999 || Socorro || LINEAR || — || align=right | 9.0 km || 
|-id=549 bgcolor=#d6d6d6
| 20549 ||  || — || September 8, 1999 || Socorro || LINEAR || EOS || align=right | 7.5 km || 
|-id=550 bgcolor=#E9E9E9
| 20550 ||  || — || September 8, 1999 || Socorro || LINEAR || — || align=right | 4.4 km || 
|-id=551 bgcolor=#fefefe
| 20551 ||  || — || September 9, 1999 || Socorro || LINEAR || — || align=right | 3.0 km || 
|-id=552 bgcolor=#E9E9E9
| 20552 ||  || — || September 9, 1999 || Socorro || LINEAR || — || align=right | 6.9 km || 
|-id=553 bgcolor=#fefefe
| 20553 Donaldhowk ||  ||  || September 9, 1999 || Socorro || LINEAR || NYS || align=right | 3.2 km || 
|-id=554 bgcolor=#d6d6d6
| 20554 ||  || — || September 9, 1999 || Socorro || LINEAR || EMA || align=right | 7.2 km || 
|-id=555 bgcolor=#fefefe
| 20555 Jennings ||  ||  || September 9, 1999 || Socorro || LINEAR || — || align=right | 3.2 km || 
|-id=556 bgcolor=#fefefe
| 20556 Midgekimble ||  ||  || September 9, 1999 || Socorro || LINEAR || — || align=right | 3.7 km || 
|-id=557 bgcolor=#fefefe
| 20557 Davidkulka ||  ||  || September 9, 1999 || Socorro || LINEAR || V || align=right | 4.0 km || 
|-id=558 bgcolor=#E9E9E9
| 20558 ||  || — || September 9, 1999 || Socorro || LINEAR || GEF || align=right | 5.2 km || 
|-id=559 bgcolor=#E9E9E9
| 20559 Sheridanlamp ||  ||  || September 9, 1999 || Socorro || LINEAR || RAF || align=right | 3.6 km || 
|-id=560 bgcolor=#E9E9E9
| 20560 ||  || — || September 9, 1999 || Socorro || LINEAR || — || align=right | 11 km || 
|-id=561 bgcolor=#fefefe
| 20561 ||  || — || September 9, 1999 || Socorro || LINEAR || — || align=right | 3.2 km || 
|-id=562 bgcolor=#fefefe
| 20562 ||  || — || September 9, 1999 || Socorro || LINEAR || slow || align=right | 7.9 km || 
|-id=563 bgcolor=#E9E9E9
| 20563 ||  || — || September 9, 1999 || Socorro || LINEAR || — || align=right | 4.7 km || 
|-id=564 bgcolor=#E9E9E9
| 20564 Michaellane ||  ||  || September 9, 1999 || Socorro || LINEAR || — || align=right | 3.4 km || 
|-id=565 bgcolor=#d6d6d6
| 20565 ||  || — || September 9, 1999 || Socorro || LINEAR || — || align=right | 7.8 km || 
|-id=566 bgcolor=#fefefe
| 20566 Laurielee ||  ||  || September 9, 1999 || Socorro || LINEAR || — || align=right | 4.4 km || 
|-id=567 bgcolor=#fefefe
| 20567 McQuarrie ||  ||  || September 9, 1999 || Socorro || LINEAR || — || align=right | 3.4 km || 
|-id=568 bgcolor=#fefefe
| 20568 Migaki ||  ||  || September 9, 1999 || Socorro || LINEAR || V || align=right | 2.6 km || 
|-id=569 bgcolor=#d6d6d6
| 20569 ||  || — || September 9, 1999 || Socorro || LINEAR || MEL || align=right | 17 km || 
|-id=570 bgcolor=#fefefe
| 20570 Molchan ||  ||  || September 9, 1999 || Socorro || LINEAR || V || align=right | 3.4 km || 
|-id=571 bgcolor=#fefefe
| 20571 Tiamorrison ||  ||  || September 9, 1999 || Socorro || LINEAR || slow? || align=right | 3.1 km || 
|-id=572 bgcolor=#d6d6d6
| 20572 Celemorrow ||  ||  || September 9, 1999 || Socorro || LINEAR || — || align=right | 6.8 km || 
|-id=573 bgcolor=#E9E9E9
| 20573 Garynadler ||  ||  || September 9, 1999 || Socorro || LINEAR || WIT || align=right | 4.1 km || 
|-id=574 bgcolor=#fefefe
| 20574 Ochinero ||  ||  || September 9, 1999 || Socorro || LINEAR || V || align=right | 2.1 km || 
|-id=575 bgcolor=#fefefe
| 20575 ||  || — || September 9, 1999 || Socorro || LINEAR || V || align=right | 5.2 km || 
|-id=576 bgcolor=#fefefe
| 20576 Marieoertle ||  ||  || September 9, 1999 || Socorro || LINEAR || FLO || align=right | 2.3 km || 
|-id=577 bgcolor=#E9E9E9
| 20577 ||  || — || September 9, 1999 || Socorro || LINEAR || HOF || align=right | 11 km || 
|-id=578 bgcolor=#d6d6d6
| 20578 ||  || — || September 9, 1999 || Socorro || LINEAR || — || align=right | 5.1 km || 
|-id=579 bgcolor=#E9E9E9
| 20579 ||  || — || September 9, 1999 || Socorro || LINEAR || EUN || align=right | 5.1 km || 
|-id=580 bgcolor=#fefefe
| 20580 Marilpeters ||  ||  || September 9, 1999 || Socorro || LINEAR || NYS || align=right | 3.7 km || 
|-id=581 bgcolor=#E9E9E9
| 20581 Prendergast ||  ||  || September 9, 1999 || Socorro || LINEAR || — || align=right | 2.8 km || 
|-id=582 bgcolor=#E9E9E9
| 20582 Reichenbach ||  ||  || September 9, 1999 || Socorro || LINEAR || — || align=right | 3.9 km || 
|-id=583 bgcolor=#d6d6d6
| 20583 Richthammer ||  ||  || September 9, 1999 || Socorro || LINEAR || KOR || align=right | 4.2 km || 
|-id=584 bgcolor=#d6d6d6
| 20584 Brigidsavage ||  ||  || September 9, 1999 || Socorro || LINEAR || KOR || align=right | 4.5 km || 
|-id=585 bgcolor=#fefefe
| 20585 Wentworth ||  ||  || September 9, 1999 || Socorro || LINEAR || — || align=right | 5.3 km || 
|-id=586 bgcolor=#E9E9E9
| 20586 Elizkolod ||  ||  || September 9, 1999 || Socorro || LINEAR || — || align=right | 6.3 km || 
|-id=587 bgcolor=#d6d6d6
| 20587 Jargoldman ||  ||  || September 9, 1999 || Socorro || LINEAR || — || align=right | 7.9 km || 
|-id=588 bgcolor=#d6d6d6
| 20588 ||  || — || September 9, 1999 || Socorro || LINEAR || — || align=right | 11 km || 
|-id=589 bgcolor=#E9E9E9
| 20589 Hennyadmoni ||  ||  || September 9, 1999 || Socorro || LINEAR || — || align=right | 2.4 km || 
|-id=590 bgcolor=#E9E9E9
| 20590 Bongiovanni ||  ||  || September 9, 1999 || Socorro || LINEAR || — || align=right | 5.0 km || 
|-id=591 bgcolor=#E9E9E9
| 20591 Sameergupta ||  ||  || September 9, 1999 || Socorro || LINEAR || — || align=right | 2.5 km || 
|-id=592 bgcolor=#d6d6d6
| 20592 ||  || — || September 9, 1999 || Socorro || LINEAR || VER || align=right | 12 km || 
|-id=593 bgcolor=#fefefe
| 20593 Freilich ||  ||  || September 9, 1999 || Socorro || LINEAR || V || align=right | 3.3 km || 
|-id=594 bgcolor=#d6d6d6
| 20594 ||  || — || September 9, 1999 || Socorro || LINEAR || — || align=right | 13 km || 
|-id=595 bgcolor=#fefefe
| 20595 Ryanwisnoski ||  ||  || September 9, 1999 || Socorro || LINEAR || — || align=right | 2.6 km || 
|-id=596 bgcolor=#E9E9E9
| 20596 ||  || — || September 9, 1999 || Socorro || LINEAR || — || align=right | 3.6 km || 
|-id=597 bgcolor=#E9E9E9
| 20597 ||  || — || September 11, 1999 || Socorro || LINEAR || EUN || align=right | 4.7 km || 
|-id=598 bgcolor=#E9E9E9
| 20598 ||  || — || September 7, 1999 || Socorro || LINEAR || AGN || align=right | 4.0 km || 
|-id=599 bgcolor=#E9E9E9
| 20599 ||  || — || September 8, 1999 || Socorro || LINEAR || — || align=right | 4.5 km || 
|-id=600 bgcolor=#E9E9E9
| 20600 Danieltse ||  ||  || September 8, 1999 || Socorro || LINEAR || — || align=right | 5.0 km || 
|}

20601–20700 

|-bgcolor=#E9E9E9
| 20601 ||  || — || September 8, 1999 || Socorro || LINEAR || — || align=right | 6.9 km || 
|-id=602 bgcolor=#d6d6d6
| 20602 ||  || — || September 8, 1999 || Socorro || LINEAR || MEL || align=right | 24 km || 
|-id=603 bgcolor=#d6d6d6
| 20603 ||  || — || September 8, 1999 || Socorro || LINEAR || — || align=right | 7.5 km || 
|-id=604 bgcolor=#fefefe
| 20604 Vrishikpatil ||  ||  || September 8, 1999 || Socorro || LINEAR || KLI || align=right | 7.0 km || 
|-id=605 bgcolor=#E9E9E9
| 20605 ||  || — || September 8, 1999 || Socorro || LINEAR || EUN || align=right | 4.2 km || 
|-id=606 bgcolor=#d6d6d6
| 20606 Widemann ||  ||  || September 5, 1999 || Anderson Mesa || LONEOS || — || align=right | 9.2 km || 
|-id=607 bgcolor=#d6d6d6
| 20607 Vernazza ||  ||  || September 4, 1999 || Anderson Mesa || LONEOS || — || align=right | 15 km || 
|-id=608 bgcolor=#fefefe
| 20608 Fredmerlin ||  ||  || September 7, 1999 || Anderson Mesa || LONEOS || — || align=right | 2.7 km || 
|-id=609 bgcolor=#d6d6d6
| 20609 ||  || — || September 3, 1999 || Kitt Peak || Spacewatch || — || align=right | 6.3 km || 
|-id=610 bgcolor=#E9E9E9
| 20610 ||  || — || September 8, 1999 || Catalina || CSS || — || align=right | 4.3 km || 
|-id=611 bgcolor=#fefefe
| 20611 ||  || — || September 8, 1999 || Catalina || CSS || — || align=right | 3.3 km || 
|-id=612 bgcolor=#d6d6d6
| 20612 ||  || — || September 8, 1999 || Catalina || CSS || — || align=right | 9.7 km || 
|-id=613 bgcolor=#d6d6d6
| 20613 Chibaken ||  ||  || September 11, 1999 || Anderson Mesa || LONEOS || — || align=right | 6.2 km || 
|-id=614 bgcolor=#fefefe
| 20614 ||  || — || September 24, 1999 || Socorro || LINEAR || PHO || align=right | 4.3 km || 
|-id=615 bgcolor=#d6d6d6
| 20615 ||  || — || September 29, 1999 || Višnjan Observatory || K. Korlević || KOR || align=right | 7.2 km || 
|-id=616 bgcolor=#fefefe
| 20616 Zeeshansayed ||  ||  || September 30, 1999 || Socorro || LINEAR || — || align=right | 3.5 km || 
|-id=617 bgcolor=#d6d6d6
| 20617 ||  || — || September 29, 1999 || Socorro || LINEAR || ALA || align=right | 17 km || 
|-id=618 bgcolor=#fefefe
| 20618 Daniebutler ||  ||  || September 29, 1999 || Socorro || LINEAR || V || align=right | 2.8 km || 
|-id=619 bgcolor=#E9E9E9
| 20619 ||  || — || September 30, 1999 || Woomera || F. B. Zoltowski || — || align=right | 3.8 km || 
|-id=620 bgcolor=#d6d6d6
| 20620 ||  || — || September 30, 1999 || Catalina || CSS || — || align=right | 4.2 km || 
|-id=621 bgcolor=#fefefe
| 20621 ||  || — || October 9, 1999 || Ametlla de Mar || J. Nomen || V || align=right | 4.4 km || 
|-id=622 bgcolor=#d6d6d6
| 20622 ||  || — || October 8, 1999 || Kleť || Kleť Obs. || HYG || align=right | 12 km || 
|-id=623 bgcolor=#E9E9E9
| 20623 Davidyoung ||  ||  || October 10, 1999 || EverStaR || M. Abraham, G. Fedon || EUN || align=right | 6.2 km || 
|-id=624 bgcolor=#E9E9E9
| 20624 Dariozanetti ||  ||  || October 9, 1999 || Gnosca || S. Sposetti || EUN || align=right | 3.6 km || 
|-id=625 bgcolor=#d6d6d6
| 20625 Noto ||  ||  || October 9, 1999 || Yanagida || A. Tsuchikawa || — || align=right | 5.1 km || 
|-id=626 bgcolor=#fefefe
| 20626 ||  || — || October 4, 1999 || Socorro || LINEAR || — || align=right | 3.3 km || 
|-id=627 bgcolor=#d6d6d6
| 20627 ||  || — || October 1, 1999 || Catalina || CSS || — || align=right | 3.9 km || 
|-id=628 bgcolor=#d6d6d6
| 20628 ||  || — || October 5, 1999 || Catalina || CSS || 3:2 || align=right | 18 km || 
|-id=629 bgcolor=#d6d6d6
| 20629 ||  || — || October 2, 1999 || Socorro || LINEAR || — || align=right | 5.7 km || 
|-id=630 bgcolor=#d6d6d6
| 20630 ||  || — || October 2, 1999 || Socorro || LINEAR || 3:2 || align=right | 12 km || 
|-id=631 bgcolor=#fefefe
| 20631 Stefuller ||  ||  || October 2, 1999 || Socorro || LINEAR || V || align=right | 3.3 km || 
|-id=632 bgcolor=#fefefe
| 20632 Carlyrosser ||  ||  || October 2, 1999 || Socorro || LINEAR || — || align=right | 3.7 km || 
|-id=633 bgcolor=#d6d6d6
| 20633 ||  || — || October 2, 1999 || Socorro || LINEAR || — || align=right | 6.7 km || 
|-id=634 bgcolor=#fefefe
| 20634 Marichardson ||  ||  || October 2, 1999 || Socorro || LINEAR || — || align=right | 2.9 km || 
|-id=635 bgcolor=#d6d6d6
| 20635 ||  || — || October 2, 1999 || Socorro || LINEAR || ALA || align=right | 24 km || 
|-id=636 bgcolor=#E9E9E9
| 20636 ||  || — || October 2, 1999 || Socorro || LINEAR || — || align=right | 4.3 km || 
|-id=637 bgcolor=#fefefe
| 20637 ||  || — || October 3, 1999 || Socorro || LINEAR || — || align=right | 3.3 km || 
|-id=638 bgcolor=#E9E9E9
| 20638 Lingchen ||  ||  || October 4, 1999 || Socorro || LINEAR || PAD || align=right | 8.1 km || 
|-id=639 bgcolor=#E9E9E9
| 20639 Michellouie ||  ||  || October 4, 1999 || Socorro || LINEAR || — || align=right | 4.0 km || 
|-id=640 bgcolor=#d6d6d6
| 20640 ||  || — || October 4, 1999 || Socorro || LINEAR || 3:2 || align=right | 14 km || 
|-id=641 bgcolor=#d6d6d6
| 20641 Yenuanchen ||  ||  || October 4, 1999 || Socorro || LINEAR || — || align=right | 8.2 km || 
|-id=642 bgcolor=#d6d6d6
| 20642 Laurajohnson ||  ||  || October 4, 1999 || Socorro || LINEAR || HYG || align=right | 7.3 km || 
|-id=643 bgcolor=#fefefe
| 20643 Angelicaliu ||  ||  || October 7, 1999 || Socorro || LINEAR || NYS || align=right | 5.5 km || 
|-id=644 bgcolor=#E9E9E9
| 20644 Amritdas ||  ||  || October 7, 1999 || Socorro || LINEAR || — || align=right | 4.0 km || 
|-id=645 bgcolor=#d6d6d6
| 20645 ||  || — || October 7, 1999 || Socorro || LINEAR || — || align=right | 13 km || 
|-id=646 bgcolor=#d6d6d6
| 20646 Nikhilgupta ||  ||  || October 7, 1999 || Socorro || LINEAR || — || align=right | 5.9 km || 
|-id=647 bgcolor=#E9E9E9
| 20647 ||  || — || October 7, 1999 || Socorro || LINEAR || — || align=right | 5.1 km || 
|-id=648 bgcolor=#d6d6d6
| 20648 ||  || — || October 10, 1999 || Socorro || LINEAR || — || align=right | 9.7 km || 
|-id=649 bgcolor=#d6d6d6
| 20649 Miklenov ||  ||  || October 10, 1999 || Socorro || LINEAR || KOR || align=right | 3.6 km || 
|-id=650 bgcolor=#E9E9E9
| 20650 ||  || — || October 10, 1999 || Socorro || LINEAR || — || align=right | 4.5 km || 
|-id=651 bgcolor=#E9E9E9
| 20651 ||  || — || October 1, 1999 || Catalina || CSS || — || align=right | 5.9 km || 
|-id=652 bgcolor=#fefefe
| 20652 ||  || — || October 2, 1999 || Catalina || CSS || — || align=right | 5.6 km || 
|-id=653 bgcolor=#d6d6d6
| 20653 ||  || — || October 7, 1999 || Catalina || CSS || — || align=right | 18 km || 
|-id=654 bgcolor=#d6d6d6
| 20654 ||  || — || October 8, 1999 || Catalina || CSS || — || align=right | 11 km || 
|-id=655 bgcolor=#d6d6d6
| 20655 ||  || — || October 8, 1999 || Catalina || CSS || — || align=right | 11 km || 
|-id=656 bgcolor=#d6d6d6
| 20656 ||  || — || October 9, 1999 || Socorro || LINEAR || THM || align=right | 7.9 km || 
|-id=657 bgcolor=#d6d6d6
| 20657 Alvarez-Candal ||  ||  || October 14, 1999 || Anderson Mesa || LONEOS || — || align=right | 10 km || 
|-id=658 bgcolor=#fefefe
| 20658 Bushmarinov ||  ||  || October 3, 1999 || Socorro || LINEAR || V || align=right | 2.4 km || 
|-id=659 bgcolor=#d6d6d6
| 20659 || 1999 UE || — || October 16, 1999 || Višnjan Observatory || K. Korlević || THM || align=right | 8.1 km || 
|-id=660 bgcolor=#d6d6d6
| 20660 || 1999 UF || — || October 16, 1999 || Višnjan Observatory || K. Korlević || HYG || align=right | 11 km || 
|-id=661 bgcolor=#d6d6d6
| 20661 || 1999 UZ || — || October 16, 1999 || Višnjan Observatory || K. Korlević || THM || align=right | 8.0 km || 
|-id=662 bgcolor=#E9E9E9
| 20662 ||  || — || October 16, 1999 || Višnjan Observatory || K. Korlević || — || align=right | 5.5 km || 
|-id=663 bgcolor=#fefefe
| 20663 ||  || — || October 19, 1999 || Fountain Hills || C. W. Juels || V || align=right | 3.0 km || 
|-id=664 bgcolor=#d6d6d6
| 20664 Senec ||  ||  || October 31, 1999 || Modra || A. Galád, J. Tóth || SYL7:4 || align=right | 15 km || 
|-id=665 bgcolor=#d6d6d6
| 20665 ||  || — || October 29, 1999 || Catalina || CSS || — || align=right | 11 km || 
|-id=666 bgcolor=#d6d6d6
| 20666 ||  || — || October 29, 1999 || Catalina || CSS || TEL || align=right | 5.4 km || 
|-id=667 bgcolor=#d6d6d6
| 20667 ||  || — || October 27, 1999 || Višnjan Observatory || K. Korlević || THM || align=right | 8.3 km || 
|-id=668 bgcolor=#fefefe
| 20668 ||  || — || October 27, 1999 || Višnjan Observatory || K. Korlević || — || align=right | 4.5 km || 
|-id=669 bgcolor=#d6d6d6
| 20669 ||  || — || October 29, 1999 || Catalina || CSS || — || align=right | 7.3 km || 
|-id=670 bgcolor=#d6d6d6
| 20670 ||  || — || October 31, 1999 || Catalina || CSS || — || align=right | 12 km || 
|-id=671 bgcolor=#E9E9E9
| 20671 ||  || — || October 31, 1999 || Catalina || CSS || ADE || align=right | 6.5 km || 
|-id=672 bgcolor=#E9E9E9
| 20672 ||  || — || October 30, 1999 || Catalina || CSS || CLO || align=right | 10 km || 
|-id=673 bgcolor=#d6d6d6
| 20673 Janelle || 1999 VW ||  || November 3, 1999 || Farpoint || G. Bell || — || align=right | 6.0 km || 
|-id=674 bgcolor=#d6d6d6
| 20674 ||  || — || November 4, 1999 || Oohira || T. Urata || — || align=right | 15 km || 
|-id=675 bgcolor=#d6d6d6
| 20675 ||  || — || November 5, 1999 || Oizumi || T. Kobayashi || — || align=right | 14 km || 
|-id=676 bgcolor=#d6d6d6
| 20676 ||  || — || November 8, 1999 || Fountain Hills || C. W. Juels || ALA || align=right | 18 km || 
|-id=677 bgcolor=#E9E9E9
| 20677 ||  || — || November 7, 1999 || Višnjan Observatory || K. Korlević || MAR || align=right | 6.3 km || 
|-id=678 bgcolor=#fefefe
| 20678 ||  || — || November 8, 1999 || Višnjan Observatory || K. Korlević || — || align=right | 3.2 km || 
|-id=679 bgcolor=#d6d6d6
| 20679 ||  || — || November 9, 1999 || Fountain Hills || C. W. Juels || URS || align=right | 17 km || 
|-id=680 bgcolor=#E9E9E9
| 20680 ||  || — || November 9, 1999 || Fountain Hills || C. W. Juels || EUN || align=right | 5.8 km || 
|-id=681 bgcolor=#E9E9E9
| 20681 ||  || — || November 9, 1999 || Oizumi || T. Kobayashi || — || align=right | 4.9 km || 
|-id=682 bgcolor=#E9E9E9
| 20682 ||  || — || November 14, 1999 || Fountain Hills || C. W. Juels || EUN || align=right | 6.6 km || 
|-id=683 bgcolor=#E9E9E9
| 20683 ||  || — || November 4, 1999 || Catalina || CSS || — || align=right | 3.2 km || 
|-id=684 bgcolor=#E9E9E9
| 20684 ||  || — || November 4, 1999 || Catalina || CSS || GEF || align=right | 4.7 km || 
|-id=685 bgcolor=#E9E9E9
| 20685 ||  || — || November 3, 1999 || Socorro || LINEAR || — || align=right | 4.7 km || 
|-id=686 bgcolor=#fefefe
| 20686 Thottumkara ||  ||  || November 4, 1999 || Socorro || LINEAR || EUT || align=right | 2.6 km || 
|-id=687 bgcolor=#E9E9E9
| 20687 Saletore ||  ||  || November 4, 1999 || Socorro || LINEAR || GEF || align=right | 3.8 km || 
|-id=688 bgcolor=#d6d6d6
| 20688 ||  || — || November 4, 1999 || Socorro || LINEAR || HYG || align=right | 8.4 km || 
|-id=689 bgcolor=#E9E9E9
| 20689 Zhuyuanchen ||  ||  || November 4, 1999 || Socorro || LINEAR || GEF || align=right | 4.2 km || 
|-id=690 bgcolor=#d6d6d6
| 20690 Crivello ||  ||  || November 4, 1999 || Socorro || LINEAR || KOR || align=right | 3.4 km || 
|-id=691 bgcolor=#FA8072
| 20691 ||  || — || November 11, 1999 || Siding Spring || R. H. McNaught || PHO || align=right | 5.8 km || 
|-id=692 bgcolor=#d6d6d6
| 20692 ||  || — || November 1, 1999 || Kitt Peak || Spacewatch || THM || align=right | 11 km || 
|-id=693 bgcolor=#d6d6d6
| 20693 Ramondiaz ||  ||  || November 5, 1999 || Socorro || LINEAR || THM || align=right | 7.7 km || 
|-id=694 bgcolor=#E9E9E9
| 20694 ||  || — || November 1, 1999 || Kitt Peak || Spacewatch || — || align=right | 3.4 km || 
|-id=695 bgcolor=#d6d6d6
| 20695 ||  || — || November 9, 1999 || Socorro || LINEAR || HYG || align=right | 8.7 km || 
|-id=696 bgcolor=#d6d6d6
| 20696 Torresduarte ||  ||  || November 9, 1999 || Socorro || LINEAR || THM || align=right | 6.7 km || 
|-id=697 bgcolor=#d6d6d6
| 20697 ||  || — || November 9, 1999 || Catalina || CSS || EOS || align=right | 4.9 km || 
|-id=698 bgcolor=#E9E9E9
| 20698 ||  || — || November 9, 1999 || Kitt Peak || Spacewatch || — || align=right | 9.2 km || 
|-id=699 bgcolor=#E9E9E9
| 20699 ||  || — || November 11, 1999 || Catalina || CSS || RAF || align=right | 5.3 km || 
|-id=700 bgcolor=#E9E9E9
| 20700 ||  || — || November 8, 1999 || Socorro || LINEAR || MAR || align=right | 3.6 km || 
|}

20701–20800 

|-bgcolor=#d6d6d6
| 20701 ||  || — || November 6, 1999 || Socorro || LINEAR || — || align=right | 13 km || 
|-id=702 bgcolor=#d6d6d6
| 20702 ||  || — || November 3, 1999 || Catalina || CSS || — || align=right | 9.7 km || 
|-id=703 bgcolor=#E9E9E9
| 20703 ||  || — || November 8, 1999 || Catalina || CSS || — || align=right | 4.2 km || 
|-id=704 bgcolor=#d6d6d6
| 20704 || 1999 WH || — || November 16, 1999 || Oizumi || T. Kobayashi || EOS || align=right | 12 km || 
|-id=705 bgcolor=#d6d6d6
| 20705 ||  || — || November 18, 1999 || Oizumi || T. Kobayashi || — || align=right | 14 km || 
|-id=706 bgcolor=#fefefe
| 20706 ||  || — || November 28, 1999 || Oizumi || T. Kobayashi || — || align=right | 3.8 km || 
|-id=707 bgcolor=#d6d6d6
| 20707 ||  || — || November 28, 1999 || Oizumi || T. Kobayashi || — || align=right | 24 km || 
|-id=708 bgcolor=#d6d6d6
| 20708 ||  || — || December 2, 1999 || Oizumi || T. Kobayashi || EOS || align=right | 9.7 km || 
|-id=709 bgcolor=#E9E9E9
| 20709 ||  || — || December 2, 1999 || Kvistaberg || UDAS || — || align=right | 4.1 km || 
|-id=710 bgcolor=#d6d6d6
| 20710 ||  || — || December 5, 1999 || Catalina || CSS || EOS || align=right | 6.8 km || 
|-id=711 bgcolor=#d6d6d6
| 20711 ||  || — || December 5, 1999 || Socorro || LINEAR || — || align=right | 6.9 km || 
|-id=712 bgcolor=#E9E9E9
| 20712 ||  || — || December 5, 1999 || Socorro || LINEAR || EUN || align=right | 5.9 km || 
|-id=713 bgcolor=#d6d6d6
| 20713 ||  || — || December 6, 1999 || Socorro || LINEAR || — || align=right | 21 km || 
|-id=714 bgcolor=#d6d6d6
| 20714 ||  || — || December 7, 1999 || Fountain Hills || C. W. Juels || EOS || align=right | 8.7 km || 
|-id=715 bgcolor=#d6d6d6
| 20715 ||  || — || December 7, 1999 || Socorro || LINEAR || — || align=right | 8.1 km || 
|-id=716 bgcolor=#C2FFFF
| 20716 ||  || — || December 7, 1999 || Socorro || LINEAR || L4 || align=right | 26 km || 
|-id=717 bgcolor=#E9E9E9
| 20717 ||  || — || December 7, 1999 || Socorro || LINEAR || — || align=right | 7.0 km || 
|-id=718 bgcolor=#d6d6d6
| 20718 ||  || — || December 7, 1999 || Socorro || LINEAR || 7:4 || align=right | 23 km || 
|-id=719 bgcolor=#fefefe
| 20719 Velasco ||  ||  || December 7, 1999 || Socorro || LINEAR || — || align=right | 3.0 km || 
|-id=720 bgcolor=#C2FFFF
| 20720 ||  || — || December 7, 1999 || Socorro || LINEAR || L4 || align=right | 34 km || 
|-id=721 bgcolor=#d6d6d6
| 20721 ||  || — || December 9, 1999 || Fountain Hills || C. W. Juels || EOS || align=right | 11 km || 
|-id=722 bgcolor=#d6d6d6
| 20722 ||  || — || December 4, 1999 || Catalina || CSS || EOS || align=right | 9.7 km || 
|-id=723 bgcolor=#E9E9E9
| 20723 ||  || — || December 11, 1999 || Socorro || LINEAR || — || align=right | 5.7 km || 
|-id=724 bgcolor=#d6d6d6
| 20724 ||  || — || December 5, 1999 || Catalina || CSS || — || align=right | 8.0 km || 
|-id=725 bgcolor=#d6d6d6
| 20725 ||  || — || December 5, 1999 || Catalina || CSS || — || align=right | 17 km || 
|-id=726 bgcolor=#fefefe
| 20726 ||  || — || December 7, 1999 || Catalina || CSS || — || align=right | 5.5 km || 
|-id=727 bgcolor=#d6d6d6
| 20727 ||  || — || December 7, 1999 || Catalina || CSS || EOS || align=right | 6.9 km || 
|-id=728 bgcolor=#fefefe
| 20728 ||  || — || December 14, 1999 || Fountain Hills || C. W. Juels || FLO || align=right | 3.3 km || 
|-id=729 bgcolor=#C2FFFF
| 20729 ||  || — || December 15, 1999 || Fountain Hills || C. W. Juels || L4 || align=right | 51 km || 
|-id=730 bgcolor=#E9E9E9
| 20730 Jorgecarvano ||  ||  || December 9, 1999 || Anderson Mesa || LONEOS || — || align=right | 4.8 km || 
|-id=731 bgcolor=#d6d6d6
| 20731 Mothédiniz ||  ||  || December 9, 1999 || Anderson Mesa || LONEOS || — || align=right | 11 km || 
|-id=732 bgcolor=#d6d6d6
| 20732 ||  || — || December 10, 1999 || Socorro || LINEAR || — || align=right | 7.5 km || 
|-id=733 bgcolor=#d6d6d6
| 20733 ||  || — || December 10, 1999 || Socorro || LINEAR || — || align=right | 16 km || 
|-id=734 bgcolor=#d6d6d6
| 20734 ||  || — || December 10, 1999 || Socorro || LINEAR || ALA || align=right | 24 km || 
|-id=735 bgcolor=#d6d6d6
| 20735 ||  || — || December 10, 1999 || Socorro || LINEAR || — || align=right | 14 km || 
|-id=736 bgcolor=#d6d6d6
| 20736 ||  || — || December 10, 1999 || Socorro || LINEAR || — || align=right | 15 km || 
|-id=737 bgcolor=#d6d6d6
| 20737 ||  || — || December 12, 1999 || Socorro || LINEAR || — || align=right | 7.4 km || 
|-id=738 bgcolor=#C2FFFF
| 20738 ||  || — || December 12, 1999 || Socorro || LINEAR || L4 || align=right | 25 km || 
|-id=739 bgcolor=#C2FFFF
| 20739 ||  || — || December 12, 1999 || Socorro || LINEAR || L4 || align=right | 27 km || 
|-id=740 bgcolor=#d6d6d6
| 20740 Sémery ||  ||  || December 13, 1999 || Anderson Mesa || LONEOS || HYG || align=right | 13 km || 
|-id=741 bgcolor=#d6d6d6
| 20741 Jeanmichelreess ||  ||  || December 7, 1999 || Anderson Mesa || LONEOS || — || align=right | 14 km || 
|-id=742 bgcolor=#E9E9E9
| 20742 ||  || — || December 14, 1999 || Catalina || CSS || HNS || align=right | 4.5 km || 
|-id=743 bgcolor=#d6d6d6
| 20743 ||  || — || January 2, 2000 || Socorro || LINEAR || ALA || align=right | 21 km || 
|-id=744 bgcolor=#E9E9E9
| 20744 ||  || — || January 8, 2000 || Socorro || LINEAR || GEF || align=right | 6.1 km || 
|-id=745 bgcolor=#E9E9E9
| 20745 ||  || — || January 8, 2000 || Socorro || LINEAR || EUN || align=right | 7.0 km || 
|-id=746 bgcolor=#E9E9E9
| 20746 ||  || — || January 8, 2000 || Socorro || LINEAR || — || align=right | 4.3 km || 
|-id=747 bgcolor=#E9E9E9
| 20747 ||  || — || January 8, 2000 || Socorro || LINEAR || EUN || align=right | 7.2 km || 
|-id=748 bgcolor=#d6d6d6
| 20748 ||  || — || January 8, 2000 || Socorro || LINEAR || EOS || align=right | 7.4 km || 
|-id=749 bgcolor=#fefefe
| 20749 ||  || — || January 9, 2000 || Socorro || LINEAR || — || align=right | 6.4 km || 
|-id=750 bgcolor=#E9E9E9
| 20750 ||  || — || January 9, 2000 || Socorro || LINEAR || — || align=right | 7.8 km || 
|-id=751 bgcolor=#d6d6d6
| 20751 ||  || — || January 9, 2000 || Socorro || LINEAR || — || align=right | 15 km || 
|-id=752 bgcolor=#d6d6d6
| 20752 ||  || — || January 9, 2000 || Socorro || LINEAR || — || align=right | 7.7 km || 
|-id=753 bgcolor=#E9E9E9
| 20753 ||  || — || January 5, 2000 || Kitt Peak || Spacewatch || EUN || align=right | 5.4 km || 
|-id=754 bgcolor=#d6d6d6
| 20754 ||  || — || January 8, 2000 || Socorro || LINEAR || — || align=right | 9.9 km || 
|-id=755 bgcolor=#d6d6d6
| 20755 ||  || — || January 27, 2000 || Socorro || LINEAR || — || align=right | 15 km || 
|-id=756 bgcolor=#E9E9E9
| 20756 ||  || — || January 27, 2000 || Kvistaberg || UDAS || HEN || align=right | 3.3 km || 
|-id=757 bgcolor=#E9E9E9
| 20757 ||  || — || February 2, 2000 || Socorro || LINEAR || EUN || align=right | 4.4 km || 
|-id=758 bgcolor=#E9E9E9
| 20758 ||  || — || February 8, 2000 || Socorro || LINEAR || EUN || align=right | 6.2 km || 
|-id=759 bgcolor=#E9E9E9
| 20759 ||  || — || February 6, 2000 || Socorro || LINEAR || — || align=right | 5.1 km || 
|-id=760 bgcolor=#fefefe
| 20760 Chanmatchun ||  ||  || February 27, 2000 || Rock Finder || W. K. Y. Yeung || — || align=right | 3.6 km || 
|-id=761 bgcolor=#fefefe
| 20761 ||  || — || March 5, 2000 || High Point || D. K. Chesney || — || align=right | 4.7 km || 
|-id=762 bgcolor=#d6d6d6
| 20762 ||  || — || March 4, 2000 || Socorro || LINEAR || MEL || align=right | 24 km || 
|-id=763 bgcolor=#fefefe
| 20763 ||  || — || March 31, 2000 || Kvistaberg || UDAS || — || align=right | 2.6 km || 
|-id=764 bgcolor=#d6d6d6
| 20764 ||  || — || March 29, 2000 || Socorro || LINEAR || — || align=right | 7.9 km || 
|-id=765 bgcolor=#E9E9E9
| 20765 ||  || — || May 7, 2000 || Socorro || LINEAR || MAR || align=right | 6.7 km || 
|-id=766 bgcolor=#E9E9E9
| 20766 ||  || — || August 1, 2000 || Socorro || LINEAR || — || align=right | 4.3 km || 
|-id=767 bgcolor=#E9E9E9
| 20767 ||  || — || August 2, 2000 || Socorro || LINEAR || EUN || align=right | 6.1 km || 
|-id=768 bgcolor=#fefefe
| 20768 Langberg ||  ||  || August 25, 2000 || Socorro || LINEAR || NYS || align=right | 4.8 km || 
|-id=769 bgcolor=#E9E9E9
| 20769 ||  || — || August 28, 2000 || Socorro || LINEAR || — || align=right | 3.1 km || 
|-id=770 bgcolor=#E9E9E9
| 20770 ||  || — || August 25, 2000 || Socorro || LINEAR || — || align=right | 2.1 km || 
|-id=771 bgcolor=#fefefe
| 20771 ||  || — || August 25, 2000 || Socorro || LINEAR || — || align=right | 9.1 km || 
|-id=772 bgcolor=#E9E9E9
| 20772 Brittajones ||  ||  || August 31, 2000 || Socorro || LINEAR || — || align=right | 4.0 km || 
|-id=773 bgcolor=#d6d6d6
| 20773 Aneeshvenkat ||  ||  || August 31, 2000 || Socorro || LINEAR || — || align=right | 8.9 km || 
|-id=774 bgcolor=#d6d6d6
| 20774 ||  || — || September 1, 2000 || Socorro || LINEAR || KOR || align=right | 6.5 km || 
|-id=775 bgcolor=#fefefe
| 20775 ||  || — || September 1, 2000 || Socorro || LINEAR || — || align=right | 2.9 km || 
|-id=776 bgcolor=#E9E9E9
| 20776 Juliekrugler ||  ||  || September 1, 2000 || Socorro || LINEAR || — || align=right | 4.3 km || 
|-id=777 bgcolor=#E9E9E9
| 20777 ||  || — || September 1, 2000 || Socorro || LINEAR || — || align=right | 7.1 km || 
|-id=778 bgcolor=#fefefe
| 20778 Wangchaohao ||  ||  || September 1, 2000 || Socorro || LINEAR || — || align=right | 2.9 km || 
|-id=779 bgcolor=#fefefe
| 20779 Xiajunchao ||  ||  || September 1, 2000 || Socorro || LINEAR || — || align=right | 2.4 km || 
|-id=780 bgcolor=#E9E9E9
| 20780 Chanyikhei ||  ||  || September 1, 2000 || Socorro || LINEAR || — || align=right | 4.5 km || 
|-id=781 bgcolor=#fefefe
| 20781 ||  || — || September 5, 2000 || Socorro || LINEAR || — || align=right | 2.4 km || 
|-id=782 bgcolor=#fefefe
| 20782 Markcroce ||  ||  || September 4, 2000 || Socorro || LINEAR || — || align=right | 4.5 km || 
|-id=783 bgcolor=#E9E9E9
| 20783 ||  || — || September 3, 2000 || Socorro || LINEAR || — || align=right | 4.8 km || 
|-id=784 bgcolor=#fefefe
| 20784 Trevorpowers ||  ||  || September 6, 2000 || Socorro || LINEAR || — || align=right | 3.6 km || 
|-id=785 bgcolor=#fefefe
| 20785 Mitalithakor ||  ||  || September 3, 2000 || Socorro || LINEAR || — || align=right | 3.3 km || 
|-id=786 bgcolor=#FA8072
| 20786 ||  || — || September 1, 2000 || Socorro || LINEAR || — || align=right | 3.4 km || 
|-id=787 bgcolor=#fefefe
| 20787 Mitchfourman ||  ||  || September 2, 2000 || Socorro || LINEAR || — || align=right | 3.2 km || 
|-id=788 bgcolor=#E9E9E9
| 20788 ||  || — || September 23, 2000 || Socorro || LINEAR || EUN || align=right | 5.1 km || 
|-id=789 bgcolor=#E9E9E9
| 20789 Hughgrant ||  ||  || September 28, 2000 || Fountain Hills || C. W. Juels || — || align=right | 5.3 km || 
|-id=790 bgcolor=#FFC2E0
| 20790 ||  || — || September 26, 2000 || Socorro || LINEAR || AMO +1km || align=right | 1.9 km || 
|-id=791 bgcolor=#E9E9E9
| 20791 ||  || — || September 24, 2000 || Socorro || LINEAR || — || align=right | 3.7 km || 
|-id=792 bgcolor=#E9E9E9
| 20792 ||  || — || September 24, 2000 || Socorro || LINEAR || — || align=right | 6.3 km || 
|-id=793 bgcolor=#E9E9E9
| 20793 Goldinaaron ||  ||  || September 24, 2000 || Socorro || LINEAR || — || align=right | 4.0 km || 
|-id=794 bgcolor=#fefefe
| 20794 Ryanolson ||  ||  || September 27, 2000 || Socorro || LINEAR || FLO || align=right | 2.2 km || 
|-id=795 bgcolor=#fefefe
| 20795 ||  || — || September 27, 2000 || Socorro || LINEAR || NYS || align=right | 2.7 km || 
|-id=796 bgcolor=#d6d6d6
| 20796 Philipmunoz ||  ||  || September 24, 2000 || Socorro || LINEAR || slow || align=right | 4.2 km || 
|-id=797 bgcolor=#E9E9E9
| 20797 ||  || — || September 27, 2000 || Socorro || LINEAR || EUN || align=right | 7.5 km || 
|-id=798 bgcolor=#fefefe
| 20798 Verlinden ||  ||  || September 27, 2000 || Socorro || LINEAR || V || align=right | 2.9 km || 
|-id=799 bgcolor=#d6d6d6
| 20799 Ashishbakshi ||  ||  || September 27, 2000 || Socorro || LINEAR || — || align=right | 10 km || 
|-id=800 bgcolor=#E9E9E9
| 20800 ||  || — || September 27, 2000 || Socorro || LINEAR || — || align=right | 4.0 km || 
|}

20801–20900 

|-bgcolor=#E9E9E9
| 20801 ||  || — || September 28, 2000 || Socorro || LINEAR || — || align=right | 4.2 km || 
|-id=802 bgcolor=#E9E9E9
| 20802 ||  || — || September 28, 2000 || Socorro || LINEAR || — || align=right | 10 km || 
|-id=803 bgcolor=#d6d6d6
| 20803 ||  || — || September 21, 2000 || Haleakala || NEAT || — || align=right | 10 km || 
|-id=804 bgcolor=#fefefe
| 20804 Etter ||  ||  || September 25, 2000 || Socorro || LINEAR || — || align=right | 7.5 km || 
|-id=805 bgcolor=#E9E9E9
| 20805 ||  || — || September 26, 2000 || Socorro || LINEAR || EUN || align=right | 6.3 km || 
|-id=806 bgcolor=#d6d6d6
| 20806 ||  || — || September 26, 2000 || Socorro || LINEAR || — || align=right | 12 km || 
|-id=807 bgcolor=#d6d6d6
| 20807 ||  || — || September 26, 2000 || Socorro || LINEAR || EOS || align=right | 8.0 km || 
|-id=808 bgcolor=#d6d6d6
| 20808 ||  || — || September 24, 2000 || Socorro || LINEAR || — || align=right | 9.3 km || 
|-id=809 bgcolor=#fefefe
| 20809 Eshinjolly ||  ||  || September 24, 2000 || Socorro || LINEAR || — || align=right | 3.4 km || 
|-id=810 bgcolor=#E9E9E9
| 20810 ||  || — || September 26, 2000 || Socorro || LINEAR || — || align=right | 10 km || 
|-id=811 bgcolor=#E9E9E9
| 20811 ||  || — || September 26, 2000 || Socorro || LINEAR || EUN || align=right | 4.5 km || 
|-id=812 bgcolor=#E9E9E9
| 20812 Shannonbabb ||  ||  || September 27, 2000 || Socorro || LINEAR || — || align=right | 7.7 km || 
|-id=813 bgcolor=#E9E9E9
| 20813 Aakashshah ||  ||  || September 28, 2000 || Socorro || LINEAR || — || align=right | 4.4 km || 
|-id=814 bgcolor=#d6d6d6
| 20814 Laurajones ||  ||  || September 27, 2000 || Socorro || LINEAR || EOS || align=right | 6.2 km || 
|-id=815 bgcolor=#E9E9E9
| 20815 ||  || — || September 26, 2000 || Socorro || LINEAR || — || align=right | 4.2 km || 
|-id=816 bgcolor=#E9E9E9
| 20816 ||  || — || September 26, 2000 || Socorro || LINEAR || EUN || align=right | 6.7 km || 
|-id=817 bgcolor=#E9E9E9
| 20817 Liuxiaofeng ||  ||  || October 1, 2000 || Socorro || LINEAR || GEF || align=right | 4.2 km || 
|-id=818 bgcolor=#d6d6d6
| 20818 Karmadiraju ||  ||  || October 1, 2000 || Socorro || LINEAR || THM || align=right | 7.6 km || 
|-id=819 bgcolor=#d6d6d6
| 20819 ||  || — || October 1, 2000 || Socorro || LINEAR || EOS || align=right | 6.3 km || 
|-id=820 bgcolor=#d6d6d6
| 20820 ||  || — || October 24, 2000 || Socorro || LINEAR || — || align=right | 13 km || 
|-id=821 bgcolor=#fefefe
| 20821 Balasridhar ||  ||  || October 24, 2000 || Socorro || LINEAR || V || align=right | 2.0 km || 
|-id=822 bgcolor=#E9E9E9
| 20822 Lintingnien ||  ||  || October 24, 2000 || Socorro || LINEAR || — || align=right | 4.7 km || 
|-id=823 bgcolor=#d6d6d6
| 20823 Liutingchun ||  ||  || October 24, 2000 || Socorro || LINEAR || HYG || align=right | 7.2 km || 
|-id=824 bgcolor=#fefefe
| 20824 ||  || — || October 24, 2000 || Socorro || LINEAR || — || align=right | 2.1 km || 
|-id=825 bgcolor=#d6d6d6
| 20825 ||  || — || October 26, 2000 || Fountain Hills || C. W. Juels || — || align=right | 15 km || 
|-id=826 bgcolor=#FFC2E0
| 20826 ||  || — || October 21, 2000 || Bisei SG Center || BATTeRS || APO +1km || align=right | 3.7 km || 
|-id=827 bgcolor=#d6d6d6
| 20827 ||  || — || October 24, 2000 || Socorro || LINEAR || — || align=right | 8.7 km || 
|-id=828 bgcolor=#fefefe
| 20828 Linchen ||  ||  || October 24, 2000 || Socorro || LINEAR || V || align=right | 3.7 km || 
|-id=829 bgcolor=#E9E9E9
| 20829 ||  || — || October 24, 2000 || Socorro || LINEAR || GEF || align=right | 4.3 km || 
|-id=830 bgcolor=#d6d6d6
| 20830 Luyajia ||  ||  || October 24, 2000 || Socorro || LINEAR || — || align=right | 7.8 km || 
|-id=831 bgcolor=#fefefe
| 20831 Zhangyi ||  ||  || October 24, 2000 || Socorro || LINEAR || — || align=right | 1.8 km || 
|-id=832 bgcolor=#E9E9E9
| 20832 Santhikodali ||  ||  || October 24, 2000 || Socorro || LINEAR || — || align=right | 8.5 km || 
|-id=833 bgcolor=#fefefe
| 20833 ||  || — || October 24, 2000 || Socorro || LINEAR || NYS || align=right | 2.5 km || 
|-id=834 bgcolor=#fefefe
| 20834 Allihewlett ||  ||  || October 24, 2000 || Socorro || LINEAR || — || align=right | 2.8 km || 
|-id=835 bgcolor=#E9E9E9
| 20835 Eliseadcock ||  ||  || October 24, 2000 || Socorro || LINEAR || — || align=right | 4.1 km || 
|-id=836 bgcolor=#d6d6d6
| 20836 Marilytedja ||  ||  || October 24, 2000 || Socorro || LINEAR || — || align=right | 3.5 km || 
|-id=837 bgcolor=#d6d6d6
| 20837 Ramanlal ||  ||  || October 24, 2000 || Socorro || LINEAR || KOR || align=right | 4.1 km || 
|-id=838 bgcolor=#d6d6d6
| 20838 ||  || — || October 24, 2000 || Socorro || LINEAR || — || align=right | 11 km || 
|-id=839 bgcolor=#E9E9E9
| 20839 Bretharrison ||  ||  || October 24, 2000 || Socorro || LINEAR || — || align=right | 3.0 km || 
|-id=840 bgcolor=#E9E9E9
| 20840 Borishanin ||  ||  || October 25, 2000 || Socorro || LINEAR || — || align=right | 11 km || 
|-id=841 bgcolor=#d6d6d6
| 20841 ||  || — || October 25, 2000 || Socorro || LINEAR || — || align=right | 10 km || 
|-id=842 bgcolor=#d6d6d6
| 20842 ||  || — || October 31, 2000 || Socorro || LINEAR || ALA || align=right | 9.5 km || 
|-id=843 bgcolor=#fefefe
| 20843 Kuotzuhao ||  ||  || October 24, 2000 || Socorro || LINEAR || NYS || align=right | 6.5 km || 
|-id=844 bgcolor=#E9E9E9
| 20844 ||  || — || October 25, 2000 || Socorro || LINEAR || — || align=right | 4.5 km || 
|-id=845 bgcolor=#d6d6d6
| 20845 ||  || — || October 25, 2000 || Socorro || LINEAR || — || align=right | 9.5 km || 
|-id=846 bgcolor=#fefefe
| 20846 Liyulin ||  ||  || October 25, 2000 || Socorro || LINEAR || — || align=right | 3.6 km || 
|-id=847 bgcolor=#E9E9E9
| 20847 ||  || — || October 27, 2000 || Socorro || LINEAR || GEF || align=right | 5.9 km || 
|-id=848 bgcolor=#E9E9E9
| 20848 ||  || — || October 27, 2000 || Socorro || LINEAR || — || align=right | 9.8 km || 
|-id=849 bgcolor=#fefefe
| 20849 ||  || — || November 1, 2000 || Socorro || LINEAR || — || align=right | 3.2 km || 
|-id=850 bgcolor=#fefefe
| 20850 Gaglani ||  ||  || November 1, 2000 || Socorro || LINEAR || — || align=right | 3.2 km || 
|-id=851 bgcolor=#d6d6d6
| 20851 Ramachandran ||  ||  || November 1, 2000 || Socorro || LINEAR || — || align=right | 6.5 km || 
|-id=852 bgcolor=#E9E9E9
| 20852 Allilandstrom ||  ||  || November 1, 2000 || Socorro || LINEAR || — || align=right | 2.5 km || 
|-id=853 bgcolor=#E9E9E9
| 20853 Yunxiangchu ||  ||  || November 1, 2000 || Socorro || LINEAR || — || align=right | 2.4 km || 
|-id=854 bgcolor=#fefefe
| 20854 Tetruashvily ||  ||  || November 1, 2000 || Socorro || LINEAR || — || align=right | 6.0 km || 
|-id=855 bgcolor=#fefefe
| 20855 Arifawan ||  ||  || November 1, 2000 || Socorro || LINEAR || NYS || align=right | 2.9 km || 
|-id=856 bgcolor=#fefefe
| 20856 Hamzabari ||  ||  || November 1, 2000 || Socorro || LINEAR || V || align=right | 3.1 km || 
|-id=857 bgcolor=#fefefe
| 20857 Richardromeo ||  ||  || November 1, 2000 || Socorro || LINEAR || — || align=right | 2.8 km || 
|-id=858 bgcolor=#E9E9E9
| 20858 Cuirongfeng ||  ||  || November 1, 2000 || Socorro || LINEAR || — || align=right | 3.5 km || 
|-id=859 bgcolor=#d6d6d6
| 20859 ||  || — || November 1, 2000 || Socorro || LINEAR || — || align=right | 8.8 km || 
|-id=860 bgcolor=#FA8072
| 20860 ||  || — || November 1, 2000 || Socorro || LINEAR || — || align=right | 4.1 km || 
|-id=861 bgcolor=#E9E9E9
| 20861 Lesliebeh ||  ||  || November 1, 2000 || Socorro || LINEAR || — || align=right | 4.0 km || 
|-id=862 bgcolor=#fefefe
| 20862 Jenngoedhart ||  ||  || November 1, 2000 || Socorro || LINEAR || slow || align=right | 3.7 km || 
|-id=863 bgcolor=#fefefe
| 20863 Jamescronk ||  ||  || November 1, 2000 || Socorro || LINEAR || FLO || align=right | 3.8 km || 
|-id=864 bgcolor=#E9E9E9
| 20864 ||  || — || November 1, 2000 || Socorro || LINEAR || EUN || align=right | 4.6 km || 
|-id=865 bgcolor=#E9E9E9
| 20865 ||  || — || November 1, 2000 || Socorro || LINEAR || — || align=right | 5.5 km || 
|-id=866 bgcolor=#E9E9E9
| 20866 ||  || — || November 1, 2000 || Socorro || LINEAR || HNS || align=right | 8.5 km || 
|-id=867 bgcolor=#E9E9E9
| 20867 ||  || — || November 1, 2000 || Socorro || LINEAR || — || align=right | 6.5 km || 
|-id=868 bgcolor=#d6d6d6
| 20868 ||  || — || November 1, 2000 || Socorro || LINEAR || — || align=right | 9.6 km || 
|-id=869 bgcolor=#fefefe
| 20869 ||  || — || November 1, 2000 || Socorro || LINEAR || — || align=right | 8.3 km || 
|-id=870 bgcolor=#d6d6d6
| 20870 Kaningher ||  ||  || November 2, 2000 || Socorro || LINEAR || KOR || align=right | 3.4 km || 
|-id=871 bgcolor=#fefefe
| 20871 ||  || — || November 2, 2000 || Socorro || LINEAR || NYS || align=right | 2.2 km || 
|-id=872 bgcolor=#fefefe
| 20872 ||  || — || November 2, 2000 || Socorro || LINEAR || — || align=right | 2.4 km || 
|-id=873 bgcolor=#fefefe
| 20873 Evanfrank ||  ||  || November 2, 2000 || Socorro || LINEAR || — || align=right | 4.1 km || 
|-id=874 bgcolor=#d6d6d6
| 20874 MacGregor ||  ||  || November 2, 2000 || Socorro || LINEAR || KOR || align=right | 4.5 km || 
|-id=875 bgcolor=#d6d6d6
| 20875 ||  || — || November 2, 2000 || Socorro || LINEAR || slow || align=right | 9.4 km || 
|-id=876 bgcolor=#fefefe
| 20876 ||  || — || November 2, 2000 || Socorro || LINEAR || NYS || align=right | 3.5 km || 
|-id=877 bgcolor=#fefefe
| 20877 ||  || — || November 2, 2000 || Socorro || LINEAR || NYS || align=right | 2.1 km || 
|-id=878 bgcolor=#E9E9E9
| 20878 Uwetreske ||  ||  || November 2, 2000 || Socorro || LINEAR || — || align=right | 3.6 km || 
|-id=879 bgcolor=#fefefe
| 20879 Chengyuhsuan ||  ||  || November 3, 2000 || Socorro || LINEAR || FLO || align=right | 1.8 km || 
|-id=880 bgcolor=#E9E9E9
| 20880 Yiyideng ||  ||  || November 3, 2000 || Socorro || LINEAR || — || align=right | 3.6 km || 
|-id=881 bgcolor=#fefefe
| 20881 ||  || — || November 3, 2000 || Socorro || LINEAR || — || align=right | 2.3 km || 
|-id=882 bgcolor=#fefefe
| 20882 Paulsánchez ||  ||  || November 3, 2000 || Socorro || LINEAR || NYSmoon || align=right | 3.2 km || 
|-id=883 bgcolor=#fefefe
| 20883 Gervais ||  ||  || November 3, 2000 || Socorro || LINEAR || V || align=right | 3.0 km || 
|-id=884 bgcolor=#d6d6d6
| 20884 ||  || — || November 1, 2000 || Socorro || LINEAR || KOR || align=right | 5.1 km || 
|-id=885 bgcolor=#E9E9E9
| 20885 ||  || — || November 18, 2000 || Fountain Hills || C. W. Juels || — || align=right | 6.7 km || 
|-id=886 bgcolor=#fefefe
| 20886 ||  || — || November 18, 2000 || Fountain Hills || C. W. Juels || — || align=right | 5.9 km || 
|-id=887 bgcolor=#fefefe
| 20887 Ngwaikin ||  ||  || November 18, 2000 || Desert Beaver || W. K. Y. Yeung || — || align=right | 3.1 km || 
|-id=888 bgcolor=#E9E9E9
| 20888 Siyueguo ||  ||  || November 20, 2000 || Socorro || LINEAR || HEN || align=right | 2.9 km || 
|-id=889 bgcolor=#fefefe
| 20889 ||  || — || November 20, 2000 || Socorro || LINEAR || — || align=right | 2.5 km || 
|-id=890 bgcolor=#E9E9E9
| 20890 ||  || — || November 25, 2000 || Fountain Hills || C. W. Juels || GEF || align=right | 3.4 km || 
|-id=891 bgcolor=#E9E9E9
| 20891 ||  || — || November 23, 2000 || Haleakala || NEAT || — || align=right | 13 km || 
|-id=892 bgcolor=#fefefe
| 20892 MacChnoic ||  ||  || November 20, 2000 || Socorro || LINEAR || — || align=right | 3.3 km || 
|-id=893 bgcolor=#fefefe
| 20893 Rosymccloskey ||  ||  || November 20, 2000 || Socorro || LINEAR || FLO || align=right | 2.6 km || 
|-id=894 bgcolor=#E9E9E9
| 20894 Krumeich ||  ||  || November 21, 2000 || Socorro || LINEAR || — || align=right | 6.0 km || 
|-id=895 bgcolor=#fefefe
| 20895 ||  || — || November 20, 2000 || Socorro || LINEAR || — || align=right | 3.7 km || 
|-id=896 bgcolor=#E9E9E9
| 20896 Tiphene ||  ||  || November 20, 2000 || Anderson Mesa || LONEOS || EUN || align=right | 6.8 km || 
|-id=897 bgcolor=#E9E9E9
| 20897 Deborahdomingue ||  ||  || November 20, 2000 || Anderson Mesa || LONEOS || — || align=right | 6.0 km || 
|-id=898 bgcolor=#d6d6d6
| 20898 Fountainhills ||  ||  || November 30, 2000 || Fountain Hills || C. W. Juels || Tj (2.35) || align=right | 37 km || 
|-id=899 bgcolor=#E9E9E9
| 20899 ||  || — || December 1, 2000 || Socorro || LINEAR || MIT || align=right | 12 km || 
|-id=900 bgcolor=#d6d6d6
| 20900 ||  || — || December 1, 2000 || Socorro || LINEAR || EOSslow || align=right | 6.5 km || 
|}

20901–21000 

|-bgcolor=#fefefe
| 20901 Mattmuehler ||  ||  || December 1, 2000 || Socorro || LINEAR || V || align=right | 2.8 km || 
|-id=902 bgcolor=#E9E9E9
| 20902 Kylebeighle ||  ||  || December 1, 2000 || Socorro || LINEAR || — || align=right | 4.6 km || 
|-id=903 bgcolor=#E9E9E9
| 20903 ||  || — || December 1, 2000 || Socorro || LINEAR || EUN || align=right | 4.2 km || 
|-id=904 bgcolor=#d6d6d6
| 20904 || 2190 P-L || — || September 24, 1960 || Palomar || PLS || — || align=right | 6.0 km || 
|-id=905 bgcolor=#d6d6d6
| 20905 || 2581 P-L || — || September 24, 1960 || Palomar || PLS || KOR || align=right | 3.6 km || 
|-id=906 bgcolor=#fefefe
| 20906 || 2727 P-L || — || September 24, 1960 || Palomar || PLS || — || align=right | 2.6 km || 
|-id=907 bgcolor=#d6d6d6
| 20907 || 2762 P-L || — || September 24, 1960 || Palomar || PLS || — || align=right | 6.7 km || 
|-id=908 bgcolor=#d6d6d6
| 20908 || 2819 P-L || — || September 24, 1960 || Palomar || PLS || KOR || align=right | 3.5 km || 
|-id=909 bgcolor=#E9E9E9
| 20909 || 4026 P-L || — || September 24, 1960 || Palomar || PLS || EUN || align=right | 6.0 km || 
|-id=910 bgcolor=#E9E9E9
| 20910 || 4060 P-L || — || September 24, 1960 || Palomar || PLS || — || align=right | 5.3 km || 
|-id=911 bgcolor=#fefefe
| 20911 || 4083 P-L || — || September 24, 1960 || Palomar || PLS || FLO || align=right | 2.9 km || 
|-id=912 bgcolor=#fefefe
| 20912 || 4129 P-L || — || September 24, 1960 || Palomar || PLS || FLO || align=right | 2.1 km || 
|-id=913 bgcolor=#d6d6d6
| 20913 || 4214 P-L || — || September 24, 1960 || Palomar || PLS || — || align=right | 7.5 km || 
|-id=914 bgcolor=#fefefe
| 20914 || 4215 P-L || — || September 24, 1960 || Palomar || PLS || — || align=right | 1.7 km || 
|-id=915 bgcolor=#d6d6d6
| 20915 || 4302 P-L || — || September 24, 1960 || Palomar || PLS || HYG || align=right | 8.2 km || 
|-id=916 bgcolor=#d6d6d6
| 20916 || 4628 P-L || — || September 24, 1960 || Palomar || PLS || HYG || align=right | 7.6 km || 
|-id=917 bgcolor=#fefefe
| 20917 || 5016 P-L || — || October 22, 1960 || Palomar || PLS || FLO || align=right | 2.1 km || 
|-id=918 bgcolor=#E9E9E9
| 20918 || 6539 P-L || — || September 24, 1960 || Palomar || PLS || — || align=right | 7.0 km || 
|-id=919 bgcolor=#fefefe
| 20919 || 6606 P-L || — || September 24, 1960 || Palomar || PLS || V || align=right | 2.2 km || 
|-id=920 bgcolor=#E9E9E9
| 20920 || 6653 P-L || — || September 24, 1960 || Palomar || PLS || — || align=right | 4.2 km || 
|-id=921 bgcolor=#fefefe
| 20921 || 6680 P-L || — || September 24, 1960 || Palomar || PLS || V || align=right | 2.0 km || 
|-id=922 bgcolor=#d6d6d6
| 20922 || 6769 P-L || — || September 24, 1960 || Palomar || PLS || THM || align=right | 7.5 km || 
|-id=923 bgcolor=#d6d6d6
| 20923 || 6846 P-L || — || September 24, 1960 || Palomar || PLS || HYG || align=right | 6.8 km || 
|-id=924 bgcolor=#E9E9E9
| 20924 || 9526 P-L || — || October 17, 1960 || Palomar || PLS || — || align=right | 10 km || 
|-id=925 bgcolor=#d6d6d6
| 20925 || 9596 P-L || — || October 22, 1960 || Palomar || PLS || LIX || align=right | 8.2 km || 
|-id=926 bgcolor=#E9E9E9
| 20926 || 1101 T-1 || — || March 25, 1971 || Palomar || PLS || — || align=right | 6.1 km || 
|-id=927 bgcolor=#fefefe
| 20927 || 1126 T-1 || — || March 25, 1971 || Palomar || PLS || — || align=right | 3.4 km || 
|-id=928 bgcolor=#E9E9E9
| 20928 || 2024 T-1 || — || March 25, 1971 || Palomar || PLS || — || align=right | 3.8 km || 
|-id=929 bgcolor=#d6d6d6
| 20929 || 2050 T-1 || — || March 25, 1971 || Palomar || PLS || EOS || align=right | 5.6 km || 
|-id=930 bgcolor=#fefefe
| 20930 || 2130 T-1 || — || March 25, 1971 || Palomar || PLS || — || align=right | 1.9 km || 
|-id=931 bgcolor=#fefefe
| 20931 || 2208 T-1 || — || March 25, 1971 || Palomar || PLS || — || align=right | 4.5 km || 
|-id=932 bgcolor=#fefefe
| 20932 || 2258 T-1 || — || March 25, 1971 || Palomar || PLS || — || align=right | 5.2 km || 
|-id=933 bgcolor=#fefefe
| 20933 || 3015 T-1 || — || March 26, 1971 || Palomar || PLS || V || align=right | 2.3 km || 
|-id=934 bgcolor=#fefefe
| 20934 || 4194 T-1 || — || March 26, 1971 || Palomar || PLS || — || align=right | 3.1 km || 
|-id=935 bgcolor=#fefefe
| 20935 || 4265 T-1 || — || March 26, 1971 || Palomar || PLS || — || align=right | 2.6 km || 
|-id=936 bgcolor=#fefefe
| 20936 Nemrut Dagi || 4835 T-1 ||  || May 13, 1971 || Palomar || PLS || H || align=right | 3.6 km || 
|-id=937 bgcolor=#d6d6d6
| 20937 || 1005 T-2 || — || September 29, 1973 || Palomar || PLS || — || align=right | 4.2 km || 
|-id=938 bgcolor=#fefefe
| 20938 || 1075 T-2 || — || September 29, 1973 || Palomar || PLS || — || align=right | 2.6 km || 
|-id=939 bgcolor=#d6d6d6
| 20939 || 1178 T-2 || — || September 29, 1973 || Palomar || PLS || — || align=right | 3.9 km || 
|-id=940 bgcolor=#fefefe
| 20940 || 1236 T-2 || — || September 29, 1973 || Palomar || PLS || — || align=right | 4.5 km || 
|-id=941 bgcolor=#E9E9E9
| 20941 || 1341 T-2 || — || September 29, 1973 || Palomar || PLS || — || align=right | 2.6 km || 
|-id=942 bgcolor=#E9E9E9
| 20942 || 2092 T-2 || — || September 29, 1973 || Palomar || PLS || — || align=right | 2.5 km || 
|-id=943 bgcolor=#fefefe
| 20943 || 2115 T-2 || — || September 29, 1973 || Palomar || PLS || — || align=right | 2.4 km || 
|-id=944 bgcolor=#fefefe
| 20944 || 2200 T-2 || — || September 29, 1973 || Palomar || PLS || — || align=right | 6.1 km || 
|-id=945 bgcolor=#fefefe
| 20945 || 2248 T-2 || — || September 29, 1973 || Palomar || PLS || — || align=right | 1.6 km || 
|-id=946 bgcolor=#fefefe
| 20946 || 2316 T-2 || — || September 29, 1973 || Palomar || PLS || — || align=right | 2.3 km || 
|-id=947 bgcolor=#C2FFFF
| 20947 Polyneikes || 2638 T-2 ||  || September 29, 1973 || Palomar || PLS || L4 || align=right | 23 km || 
|-id=948 bgcolor=#fefefe
| 20948 || 2754 T-2 || — || September 30, 1973 || Palomar || PLS || V || align=right | 1.7 km || 
|-id=949 bgcolor=#E9E9E9
| 20949 || 3024 T-2 || — || September 30, 1973 || Palomar || PLS || HNS || align=right | 2.6 km || 
|-id=950 bgcolor=#fefefe
| 20950 || 3305 T-2 || — || September 30, 1973 || Palomar || PLS || NYS || align=right | 2.3 km || 
|-id=951 bgcolor=#E9E9E9
| 20951 || 4261 T-2 || — || September 29, 1973 || Palomar || PLS || — || align=right | 3.1 km || 
|-id=952 bgcolor=#C2FFFF
| 20952 Tydeus || 5151 T-2 ||  || September 25, 1973 || Palomar || PLS || L4 || align=right | 25 km || 
|-id=953 bgcolor=#d6d6d6
| 20953 || 1068 T-3 || — || October 17, 1977 || Palomar || PLS || — || align=right | 12 km || 
|-id=954 bgcolor=#d6d6d6
| 20954 || 1158 T-3 || — || October 17, 1977 || Palomar || PLS || — || align=right | 11 km || 
|-id=955 bgcolor=#d6d6d6
| 20955 || 2387 T-3 || — || October 16, 1977 || Palomar || PLS || — || align=right | 6.2 km || 
|-id=956 bgcolor=#fefefe
| 20956 || 3510 T-3 || — || October 16, 1977 || Palomar || PLS || — || align=right | 2.4 km || 
|-id=957 bgcolor=#fefefe
| 20957 || 4430 T-3 || — || October 11, 1977 || Palomar || PLS || — || align=right | 2.3 km || 
|-id=958 bgcolor=#FA8072
| 20958 || A900 MA || — || June 29, 1900 || Mount Hamilton || J. E. Keeler || — || align=right | 2.8 km || 
|-id=959 bgcolor=#E9E9E9
| 20959 || 1936 UG || — || October 21, 1936 || Nice || M. Laugier || — || align=right | 5.2 km || 
|-id=960 bgcolor=#d6d6d6
| 20960 || 1971 UR || — || October 26, 1971 || Hamburg-Bergedorf || L. Kohoutek || HYG || align=right | 13 km || 
|-id=961 bgcolor=#C2FFFF
| 20961 Arkesilaos ||  ||  || September 19, 1973 || Palomar || PLS || L4ARK || align=right | 23 km || 
|-id=962 bgcolor=#E9E9E9
| 20962 Michizane ||  ||  || March 12, 1977 || Kiso || H. Kosai, K. Furukawa || EUN || align=right | 4.5 km || 
|-id=963 bgcolor=#E9E9E9
| 20963 Pisarenko ||  ||  || August 19, 1977 || Nauchnij || N. S. Chernykh || EUN || align=right | 6.6 km || 
|-id=964 bgcolor=#fefefe
| 20964 Mons Naklethi || 1977 UA ||  || October 16, 1977 || Kleť || A. Mrkos || — || align=right | 4.0 km || 
|-id=965 bgcolor=#d6d6d6
| 20965 Kutafin ||  ||  || September 26, 1978 || Nauchnij || L. V. Zhuravleva || — || align=right | 11 km || 
|-id=966 bgcolor=#d6d6d6
| 20966 ||  || — || November 7, 1978 || Palomar || E. F. Helin, S. J. Bus || — || align=right | 7.0 km || 
|-id=967 bgcolor=#fefefe
| 20967 ||  || — || November 7, 1978 || Palomar || E. F. Helin, S. J. Bus || FLO || align=right | 1.9 km || 
|-id=968 bgcolor=#fefefe
| 20968 ||  || — || November 7, 1978 || Palomar || E. F. Helin, S. J. Bus || — || align=right | 1.9 km || 
|-id=969 bgcolor=#E9E9E9
| 20969 Samo || 1979 SH ||  || September 17, 1979 || Kleť || A. Mrkos || — || align=right | 3.2 km || 
|-id=970 bgcolor=#E9E9E9
| 20970 ||  || — || February 28, 1981 || Siding Spring || S. J. Bus || — || align=right | 3.1 km || 
|-id=971 bgcolor=#E9E9E9
| 20971 ||  || — || February 28, 1981 || Siding Spring || S. J. Bus || EUN || align=right | 3.7 km || 
|-id=972 bgcolor=#d6d6d6
| 20972 ||  || — || February 28, 1981 || Siding Spring || S. J. Bus || TEL || align=right | 3.4 km || 
|-id=973 bgcolor=#E9E9E9
| 20973 ||  || — || March 2, 1981 || Siding Spring || S. J. Bus || — || align=right | 7.3 km || 
|-id=974 bgcolor=#d6d6d6
| 20974 ||  || — || March 2, 1981 || Siding Spring || S. J. Bus || — || align=right | 11 km || 
|-id=975 bgcolor=#d6d6d6
| 20975 ||  || — || March 2, 1981 || Siding Spring || S. J. Bus || 629 || align=right | 5.2 km || 
|-id=976 bgcolor=#d6d6d6
| 20976 ||  || — || March 7, 1981 || Siding Spring || S. J. Bus || — || align=right | 7.5 km || 
|-id=977 bgcolor=#d6d6d6
| 20977 ||  || — || March 1, 1981 || Siding Spring || S. J. Bus || EOS || align=right | 6.4 km || 
|-id=978 bgcolor=#fefefe
| 20978 ||  || — || March 1, 1981 || Siding Spring || S. J. Bus || FLO || align=right | 1.5 km || 
|-id=979 bgcolor=#fefefe
| 20979 ||  || — || March 1, 1981 || Siding Spring || S. J. Bus || — || align=right | 2.2 km || 
|-id=980 bgcolor=#fefefe
| 20980 ||  || — || March 1, 1981 || Siding Spring || S. J. Bus || — || align=right | 2.3 km || 
|-id=981 bgcolor=#E9E9E9
| 20981 ||  || — || March 6, 1981 || Siding Spring || S. J. Bus || — || align=right | 2.8 km || 
|-id=982 bgcolor=#E9E9E9
| 20982 ||  || — || March 1, 1981 || Siding Spring || S. J. Bus || — || align=right | 4.2 km || 
|-id=983 bgcolor=#fefefe
| 20983 ||  || — || March 2, 1981 || Siding Spring || S. J. Bus || — || align=right | 1.6 km || 
|-id=984 bgcolor=#d6d6d6
| 20984 ||  || — || March 1, 1981 || Siding Spring || S. J. Bus || EOS || align=right | 5.1 km || 
|-id=985 bgcolor=#d6d6d6
| 20985 ||  || — || March 2, 1981 || Siding Spring || S. J. Bus || — || align=right | 12 km || 
|-id=986 bgcolor=#d6d6d6
| 20986 ||  || — || March 1, 1981 || Siding Spring || S. J. Bus || — || align=right | 6.9 km || 
|-id=987 bgcolor=#fefefe
| 20987 ||  || — || March 1, 1981 || Siding Spring || S. J. Bus || — || align=right | 2.8 km || 
|-id=988 bgcolor=#fefefe
| 20988 ||  || — || March 2, 1981 || Siding Spring || S. J. Bus || FLO || align=right | 2.6 km || 
|-id=989 bgcolor=#d6d6d6
| 20989 ||  || — || March 2, 1981 || Siding Spring || S. J. Bus || HYG || align=right | 10 km || 
|-id=990 bgcolor=#fefefe
| 20990 ||  || — || September 1, 1983 || La Silla || H. Debehogne || — || align=right | 2.9 km || 
|-id=991 bgcolor=#d6d6d6
| 20991 Jánkollár ||  ||  || November 28, 1984 || Piszkéstető || M. Antal || EOS || align=right | 7.1 km || 
|-id=992 bgcolor=#fefefe
| 20992 ||  || — || September 5, 1985 || La Silla || H. Debehogne || ERI || align=right | 4.1 km || 
|-id=993 bgcolor=#fefefe
| 20993 ||  || — || September 5, 1985 || La Silla || H. Debehogne || — || align=right | 2.7 km || 
|-id=994 bgcolor=#fefefe
| 20994 Atreya || 1985 TS ||  || October 15, 1985 || Anderson Mesa || E. Bowell || — || align=right | 3.9 km || 
|-id=995 bgcolor=#C2FFFF
| 20995 || 1985 VY || — || November 1, 1985 || La Silla || R. M. West || L4 || align=right | 26 km || 
|-id=996 bgcolor=#fefefe
| 20996 || 1986 PB || — || August 4, 1986 || Palomar || E. F. Helin || H || align=right | 3.0 km || 
|-id=997 bgcolor=#d6d6d6
| 20997 ||  || — || August 1, 1986 || Palomar || E. F. Helin || HYG || align=right | 12 km || 
|-id=998 bgcolor=#fefefe
| 20998 ||  || — || August 26, 1986 || La Silla || H. Debehogne || FLO || align=right | 2.5 km || 
|-id=999 bgcolor=#fefefe
| 20999 || 1987 BF || — || January 28, 1987 || Ojima || T. Niijima, T. Urata || FLO || align=right | 4.2 km || 
|-id=000 bgcolor=#E9E9E9
| 21000 L'Encyclopédie ||  ||  || January 26, 1987 || La Silla || E. W. Elst || MIT || align=right | 5.9 km || 
|}

References

External links 
 Discovery Circumstances: Numbered Minor Planets (20001)–(25000) (IAU Minor Planet Center)

0020